= Comparison of OpenDocument software =

The OpenDocument format (ODF), an abbreviation for the OASIS Open Document Format for Office Applications, is an open and free (excluding maintenance and support) document file format for saving and exchanging editable office documents such as text documents (including memos, reports, and books), spreadsheets, databases, charts, and presentations. This standard was developed by the OASIS industry consortium, based upon the XML-based file format originally created by OpenOffice.org, and ODF was approved as an OASIS standard on May 1, 2005. It became an ISO standard, ISO/IEC 26300, on May 3, 2006.

The following tables list applications supporting OpenDocument 1.0 (ISO/IEC 26300:2006) and OpenDocument 1.1 (OASIS Standard).

== Text documents ==
=== Word processors ===
| | Version | Operating systems | Office suite | Developer | License | ISO/IEC 26300:2006 | Notes |
|---|---|---|---|---|---|---|---|
| AbiWord | 2.4.2 | Windows, Mac OS X, Linux, Unix-based systems, ReactOS | | AbiSource | GPL | Yes | Only supports basic ODT documents. Complex ones created in OpenOffice are likely to be broken in AbiWord. |
| Apache OpenOffice Writer | 4.1.15 | Windows, Linux, Unix-based systems, Mac OS X | Apache OpenOffice | Apache Software Foundation | ALv2 | Yes | Multiple ODF versions supported (ISO/ODF 1.0/1.1/1.2 Extended) |
| Calligra Words | 2.4+ | Windows, Mac OS X, Linux, Unix-based systems | Calligra Suite | KDE Project | GPL / LGPL | Yes | |
| Collabora Office | All | Windows, Linux, macOS, Android, iOS, iPadOS, ChromeOS | Collabora Office | Collabora | MPL2 | Yes | enterprise-ready edition of LibreOffice |
| Collabora Online | All | Any (Web-based) | Collabora Online | Collabora | MPL2 | Yes | enterprise-ready edition of LibreOffice |
| Google Docs & Spreadsheets | 2006 | Any (Web-based) | Standalone or Google Apps | Google | Proprietary | Yes | |
| IBM Lotus Symphony | 1.0+ | Windows, Linux, Mac OS X | IBM Lotus Symphony | IBM | Proprietary | Yes | Based upon OpenOffice.org |
| IBM Workplace Documents | 2.5+ | Any (Web-based) | IBM Workplace Collaboration Services | IBM | Proprietary | Yes | no longer being actively marketed |
| KWord | 1.4+ | Linux, Unix-based systems | KOffice | KDE Project | LGPL | Yes | |
| LibreOffice Writer | 4.0.3 | Windows, Linux, Unix-based systems, Mac OS X, Solaris | LibreOffice | LibreOffice | MPL2 | Yes | Multiple ODF versions supported (ISO/ODF 1.0/1.1/1.2/1.3/1.3 Extended ) |
| Microsoft Office Word | 2007 SP2 | Windows | Microsoft Office | Microsoft | Proprietary | Yes | some limitations |
| NeoOffice Writer | 2.1 | Mac OS X | NeoOffice | Patrick Luby and Edward Peterlin | GPL | no (not valid) | |
| OpenOffice.org Writer | 3.0.0 | Windows, Linux, Unix-based systems, Mac OS X, Solaris | OpenOffice.org | OpenOffice.org | LGPL | Yes | adjustable ODF version (ISO/ODF 1.2) |
| OpenOffice.org Writer | 2.4.1 | Windows, Linux, Unix-based systems, Mac OS X, Solaris | OpenOffice.org | OpenOffice.org | LGPL | Yes | |
| OpenOffice.org Writer | 1.1.5 | Windows, Linux, Unix-based systems, Mac OS X | OpenOffice.org | OpenOffice.org | LGPL / SISSL | | Import only |
| StarOffice Writer | 8 | Windows, Linux, Solaris | StarOffice | Sun Microsystems | Proprietary | Yes | |
| TextMaker | 2006 and higher | Windows, Linux, FreeBSD, Pocket PC, Windows CE | SoftMaker Office | SoftMaker | Proprietary | Yes | TextMaker 2006 - not valid files; TextMaker 2010 - valid |
| TextEdit | 1.5 and higher | Mac OS X | Standalone | Apple Inc. | Bundled with Mac OS X/Source code available | Yes | |
| WordPerfect | X4 (2008) | Windows | Corel WordPerfect Office X4 | Corel | Proprietary | | Import only |
| Zoho Writer | 2006 | Any (Web-based) | Standalone | AdventNet | Proprietary | Yes | |
| | Version | Operating systems | Office suite | Developer | License | ISO/IEC 26300:2006 | Notes |

=== Other applications ===
Besides word processors, other programs can and do support the OpenDocument text format. See the List of applications supporting OpenDocument for more.

== Spreadsheet documents ==
| | Version | Operating systems | Office suite | Developer | License | ISO/IEC 26300:2006 | Notes |
|---|---|---|---|---|---|---|---|
| Calligra Sheets | 2.4+ | Windows, Mac OS X, Linux, Unix-based systems | Calligra Suite | KDE Project | GPL / LGPL | Yes | |
| Collabora Office | All | Windows, Linux, macOS, Android, iOS, iPadOS, ChromeOS | Collabora Office | Collabora | MPL2 | Yes | enterprise-ready edition of LibreOffice |
| Collabora Online | All | Any (Web-based) | Collabora Online | Collabora | MPL2 | Yes | enterprise-ready edition of LibreOffice |
| EditGrid | | Any (Web-based) | | Team and Concepts | Proprietary | Yes | |
| Gnumeric | 1.12.5+ | Linux, Unix-based systems, Windows | | GNOME | GPL | Yes | Saves in ODF 1.2 |
| Google Spreadsheets | | Any (Web-based) | Google Docs & Spreadsheets | Google | Proprietary | no (not valid) | |
| IBM Lotus Symphony | 1.0+ | Windows, Linux, Mac OS X | IBM Lotus Symphony | IBM | Proprietary | Yes | |
| IBM Workplace Documents | 2.5+ | Any (Web-based) | IBM Workplace Collaboration Services | IBM | Proprietary | Yes | no longer being actively marketed |
| KSpread / KCells | 1.4+ | Linux, Unix-based systems | KOffice | KDE Project | LGPL | Yes | |
| LibreOffice Calc | 3.3.0 | Windows, Linux, Unix-based systems, Mac OS X, Solaris | LibreOffice | LibreOffice | MPL2 | Yes | |
| Microsoft Office Excel | 2007 SP2 | Windows | Microsoft Office | Microsoft | Proprietary | No (different results in validators) | |
| NeoOffice Calc | 1.2 | Mac OS X | NeoOffice | Patrick Luby and Edward Peterlin | GPL | | Import only |
| NeoOffice Calc | 2.2.5 | Mac OS X | NeoOffice | Patrick Luby and Edward Peterlin | GPL | Yes | |
| OpenOffice.org Calc | 2.0+ | Windows, Linux, Unix-based systems, Mac OS X, Solaris | OpenOffice.org | OpenOffice.org | LGPL | Yes | |
| StarOffice Calc | 8 | Windows, Linux, Solaris | StarOffice | Sun Microsystems | Proprietary | Yes | |
| Zoho Sheet | 2006 | Any (Web-based) | Standalone | AdventNet | Proprietary | Yes | |
| | Version | Operating systems | Office suite | Developer | License | ISO/IEC 26300:2006 | Notes |

== Presentation documents ==
| | Version | Operating systems | Office suite | Developer | License | ISO/IEC 26300:2006 | Notes |
|---|---|---|---|---|---|---|---|
| Calligra Stage | 2.4+ | Windows, Mac OS X, Linux, Unix-based systems | Calligra Suite | KDE Project | GPL / LGPL | Yes | |
| Collabora Office | All | Windows, Linux, macOS, Android, iOS, iPadOS, ChromeOS | Collabora Office | Collabora | MPL2 | Yes | enterprise-ready edition of LibreOffice |
| Collabora Online | All | Any (Web-based) | Collabora Online | Collabora | MPL2 | Yes | enterprise-ready edition of LibreOffice |
| IBM Lotus Symphony | 1.0+ | Windows, Linux, Mac OS X | IBM Lotus Symphony | IBM | Proprietary | Yes | |
| IBM Workplace Documents | 2.5+ | Any (Web-based) | IBM Workplace Collaboration Services | IBM | Proprietary | | no longer being actively marketed |
| KPresenter / KOffice Showcase | 1.4+ | Linux, Unix-based systems | KOffice | KDE Project | LGPL | no (not valid) | |
| LibreOffice Impress | 3.3.0 | Windows, Linux, Unix-based systems, Mac OS X, Solaris | LibreOffice | LibreOffice | MPL2 | Yes | |
| Microsoft Office PowerPoint | 2007 SP2 | Windows | Microsoft Office | Microsoft | Proprietary | Yes | |
| NeoOffice Impress | 1.2 | Mac OS X | NeoOffice | Patrick Luby and Edward Peterlin | GPL | | Import only |
| NeoOffice Impress | 2.2.5 | Mac OS X | NeoOffice | Patrick Luby and Edward Peterlin | GPL | Yes | |
| OpenOffice.org Impress | 2.0+ | Windows, Linux, Unix-based systems, Mac OS X, Solaris | OpenOffice.org | OpenOffice.org | LGPL | Yes | |
| StarOffice Impress | 8 | Windows, Linux, Solaris | StarOffice | Sun Microsystems | Proprietary | Yes | |
| Zoho Show | 2006 | Any (Web-based) | Standalone | AdventNet | Proprietary | no (not valid) | |
| | Version | Operating systems | Office suite | Developer | License | ISO/IEC 26300:2006 | Notes |

== Conversion / publishing systems ==
| | Version | Operating systems | Office suite | Developer | License | ISO/IEC 26300:2006 | Notes |
|---|---|---|---|---|---|---|---|
| Docvert | 4.0b1 | Client: any browser (open source or proprietary HTTP clients are compatible with GPLv3 web service interface). Server: Many. | Many | Matthew Holloway | GPLv3 | Yes | |
| 3BOpenDoc | 2.1 | Desktop: Any (Web-based) Server: Linux, Windows | Many | 3BView | Proprietary | Yes | Server based |
| JODConverter | 4.0.0 | Windows, Linux, Unix-based systems, Mac OS X | N/A | http://www.jodconverter.org | Apache 2.0 | Yes | |
| Collabora Online | All | Any modern browser. Or apps for Windows, Linux, macOS, Android, iOS, iPadOS, ChromeOS. Or it can be embedded as a daemon/service and scripted. | Many | Collabora | MPL2 | Yes | |
| | Version | Operating systems | Office suite | Developer | License | ISO/IEC 26300:2006 | Notes |

== OpenDocument Format version in exported files ==
Root elements in ODF files take an office:version attribute, which indicates which version of OpenDocument Format specification it complies with. The version number is in the format revision.version. If the file has a version known to an XML processor, it may validate the document. Otherwise, it is optional to validate the document, but the document must be well formed. Informations from OpenDocument specification

Following table contains list of ODF specification version attribute office:version="1.X" used in files exported from OpenDocument software.

Tested sample documents contained one simple sentence (text documents), 10 rows with numbers (sheets), 2 slides (presentation documents). Validation was tested in two different ODF validators.

| | Tested software version | ODF version attribute in exported file office:version="1.X" | File type | Validation of simple new document | Notes |
|---|---|---|---|---|---|
| AbiWord | 2.6.4 | 1.0 | ODT | valid | |
| Adobe Buzzword | beta 3, build 600113 | 1.0 | ODT | not valid | (errors in styles.xml and content.xml) |
| EditGrid | 11/2008 | 1.0 | ODS | valid | |
| Gnumeric | 1.9.3 | 1.0 | ODS | not valid | |
| Google Docs & Spreadsheets | 11/2008 | 1.0 | ODT, ODS | valid - ODT, different results - ODS | |
| IBM Lotus Symphony | 1.1.0 | 1.1 | ODT, ODS, ODP | valid | |
| IBM Lotus Symphony | 3.0.0 FP2 | 1.2 | ODT, ODS, ODP | | |
| Inkscape | 0.4.6 | 1.0 | ODG | not valid | |
| KOffice | 1.6.3 | attribute is missing | ODT, ODS, ODP | valid - ODT, ODS, not valid - ODP | ODT, ODS - valid ODF 1.0 and 1.1 |
| KOffice | 2.1.2 | 1.2 | ODT, ODS, ODP | | |
| Microsoft Office | 2007 SP2 | 1.1 | ODT, ODS, ODP | different results - ODS, valid - ODT, ODP | |
| Microsoft Office - SUN ODF Plugin | 1.2 | 1.1 | ODT, ODS, ODP | valid | |
| Microsoft Office - SUN ODF Plugin | 3.1 | 1.2 | ODT, ODS, ODP | | |
| Microsoft Office - OpenXML/ODF Translator Add-in | 2.0 | attribute is missing | ODT, ODS, ODP | different results - ODT, valid - ODS, not valid - ODP | ODF 1.1 implemented |
| NeoOffice | 2.2.5 | 1.0 | ODT | not valid - ODT | (error in styles.xml) |
| OpenOffice.org | 2.0 - 2.3.0 | 1.0 | ODT, ODS, ODP | valid (tested 2.3.0) | |
| OpenOffice.org | 2.3.1 - 2.4.2 | 1.1 | ODT, ODS, ODP | valid | |
| OpenOffice.org | 3.0 | 1.1 and 1.2 | ODT, ODS, ODP | valid | adjustable ODF version |
| StarOffice | 8.0 product update 10 | 1.1 | ODT, ODS, ODP | valid | |
| RedOffice | 4.0 | 1.0 | ODT, ODS, ODP | valid | |
| TextEdit | 1.5 (244) | 1.0 | ODT | different results in validators | (settings.xml is missing) |
| TextMaker | 2008 rev.494 | 1.0 | ODT | not valid | (error in styles.xml) |
| TextMaker | 2010 | 1.0 | ODT | Yes | |
| WordPad | 6.1 (2009) | attribute is missing | ODT | different results in validators | (settings.xml is missing - ODF 1.0/1.1 validation) |
| Zoho Office Suite | 11/2008 | 1.0 | ODT, ODS, ODP | valid - ODT, ODS, not valid - ODP | |
| | Tested software version | ODF version attribute in exported file office:version="1.X" | File type | Validation of simple new document | Notes |

=== OpenDocument Format validators ===
- https://tdf.github.io/odftoolkit/ReleaseNotes.html
- https://web.archive.org/web/20090130070736/http://tools.odftoolkit.org/odfvalidator/
- https://web.archive.org/web/20081026030022/http://tools.services.openoffice.org/odfvalidator/
- https://web.archive.org/web/20081222095552/http://opendocumentfellowship.com/validator
- Open Document Format (ODF) Accessibility Evaluator - alpha stage (in development)
- OASIS - Office wiki - How to validate an ODF document

== See also ==
- Comparison of office suites
- Comparison of word processors
- List of software that supports OpenDocument
- Open format
- Network effect
