= List of software that supports OpenDocument =

== Current support ==
A number of applications support the OASIS Open Document Format for Office Applications; listed alphabetically they include:

=== Word processors ===
- AbiWord 2.4+ (import from 2.4.0, export from 2.4.2; used to require separate download and installation of plugins – up to version 2.6.8).
- Adobe Creative Cloud
- Apache OpenOffice Writer uses ODT as its native file format.
- Atlantis Word Processor 1.6.5+ can import ODT documents.
- Calligra Words uses ODT as its native file format.
- Collabora Office Writer for Mobile and Desktop apps uses ODT as its native file format.
- Collabora Online Writer uses ODT as its native file format.
- eyeOS Cloud computing operating system with eyeDocs Word Processor has basic support for ODF text documents.
- EasiWriter (for RISC OS) Version 9.1 can import/save ODT files on RISC OS.
- FileApp allows viewing OpenDocument files on iPhone and iPad.
- FocusWriter, a distraction-free word processor.
- Google Docs, a web-based word processor and spreadsheet application derived from the application Writely.
- Gwennel, a WYSIWYG word processor written in assembly language, under 200 KB.
- IBM Lotus Notes 8.0+ includes an office suite for creating text, spreadsheet and presentation files.
- IBM Lotus Symphony Viewer allows viewing OpenDocument texts, spreadsheets and presentations on iPad and iPhone.
- JustSystems Ichitaro (Japanese), read/write support via plug-in from version 2006, full built-in support from 2007.
- LibreOffice Writer (an OpenOffice.org fork) uses ODT as its native file format. (≥ v25.2 supports ODF 1.4)
  - Go-oo, an OpenOffice.org fork which was later merged with Libreoffice (Development discontinued).
- Microsoft Word 2003 and Office XP Word (with the Open Source OpenXML/ODF Translator Add-in for Office)
- Microsoft Word 2007 (with Service Pack 2 or 3) supports ODF 1.1 (Windows only)
- Microsoft Word 2010 supports ODF 1.1 (Windows only)
- Microsoft Word 2013 supports ODF 1.2 (Windows only)
- Microsoft Word 2016 and Microsoft Word 2019 support ODF 1.2 (Windows: read/write; OS X: read-only after online conversion)
- Microsoft Word 2021 supports ODF 1.3 (Windows and MacOS)
- Microsoft Word 2024 supports ODF 1.4 (Windows and MacOS)
- Microsoft 365 Word app supports ODF 1.4
- Microsoft OneDrive / Office Web Apps
- Mobile Office, an office package for Symbian mobile phones.
- Microsoft WordPad included with Windows 7 has limited support for opening and saving in the ODT format.
- Nisus Writer Pro 1.2+ for Mac OS X.
- OnlyOffice online and desktop editors, both online and offline suites support ODT for opening, editing and exporting.
- OpenDocument Viewer, a free Android app for reading ODT, released under GPLv3 (also available from F-Droid).
- OpenOffice Writer – full support from 2.0, import-only in 1.1.5.
  - IBM Lotus Symphony Documents 1.0+ (OpenOffice.org 1.0 derivative; Development discontinued).
  - NeoOffice Writer – full support from 2.0 (OpenOffice.org 2.0.3 derivative), import only in 1.2.2 (OpenOffice.org 1.1.5 derivative).
  - StarOffice 8+ Writer (OpenOffice.org 2.0 derivative; Development discontinued).
  - RomanianOffice, a proprietary word processor based on OpenOffice.org.
- Open Word Processor allows editing OpenDocument text files (.odt) on iPad.
- ownCloud Documents, a plugin for ownCloud, allows creation and collaborative editing of ODT files stored in ownCloud.
- TechWriter (for RISC OS) Version 9.1 of TechWriter can import/save ODT files on RISC OS.
- TextEdit, (In Mac OS X 10.5 Leopard) can read/write ODT format but does not retain all formatting.
  - Bean 1.1.0+, basic word processor with limited ODT support implemented in Mac OS X.
- TextMaker starting with version 2008.
- Visioo Writer 0.6.1 (in development) — document viewer, incomplete support.
- WordPerfect Office (import-only in X4).
- Zoho Writer, an online word processor, allows reading and writing of ODT.

=== Other applications ===
- Apple Inc.'s Quick Look, the built-in quick preview feature of Mac OS X, supports OpenDocument format files starting with Mac OS X v10.5. Support is limited to basic ODF implementation in Mac OS X.
- Oxygen XML Editor 9.3+ allows users to extract, validate, edit, transform (using XSLT or XQuery) to other file formats, compare and process the XML data stored in OpenDocument files. Validation uses the latest ODF Documents version 1.1 Relax NG Schemas.
- IBM WebSphere Portal 6.0.1+ can preview texts from ODT files as HTML documents.
- IBM Lotus Domino 8.0+ KeyView (10.4.0.0) filter supports ODT, ODS, ODP for viewing files.
- FreeViewer ODT File Viewer, can read/write ODT files, can convert ODT files to HTML documents.

==== Data management ====
- phpMyAdmin 2.9.0+ – database manager, exports to ODT.

==== Text management ====
- Dokuwiki — wiki software, exports to ODT with the odt plugin.
- Drupal ODF Import – a Drupal module allows importing ODT files into CMS nodes.
- eZ publish — content management system, supports import and export of writer documents via extension.
- Scribus 1.2.2+ — desktop publishing suite, imports ODT.

==== Translation support ====
- OmegaT — computer-assisted translation tool, can import ODF files.
- Translate Toolkit — converts OpenDocument into XLIFF 1.2 for localisation in any XLIFF aware CAT tool.

==== Bibliographic ====
- RefWorks – Web-based commercial citation manager, supports uploading ODT files for citation formatting.

== Spreadsheet documents (.ods) ==
=== Spreadsheets ===
- Calligra Sheets uses ODS as default file format.
- Collabora Office Calc for Mobile and Desktop apps uses ODS as its native file format.
- Collabora Online Calc uses ODS as its native file format.
- EditGrid, a web-based (online) spreadsheet service – full support.
- FileApp allows viewing OpenDocument files on iPhone and iPad.
- Gnumeric can both open and save files in this format and plans to continue to support this format in the future.
- Google Docs, a web-based word processor and spreadsheet application which can read and save OpenDocument files.
- IBM Lotus Notes 8.0+ includes an office suite for creating text, spreadsheet and presentation files.
- IBM Lotus Symphony Spreadsheets 1.0+ (OpenOffice.org 1.0 derivative; Development discontinued).
- IBM Lotus Symphony Viewer allows viewing OpenDocument texts, spreadsheets and presentations on iPad and iPhone.
- JustSystems JUST Suite 2009 Sanshiro (Japanese).
- LibreOffice Calc (an OpenOffice.org fork) uses ODS as its native file format.
- Microsoft Excel 2003 and Office XP Excel (with the Open Source OpenXML/ODF Translator Add-in for Office)
- Microsoft Excel 2007 (with Service Pack 2 or 3) supports ODF 1.1 (Windows only)
- Microsoft Excel 2010 supports ODF 1.1 (Windows only)
- Microsoft Excel 2013 supports ODF 1.2 (Windows only)
- Microsoft Excel 2016 and Microsoft Excel 2019 support ODF 1.2 (Windows: read/write; OS X: read-only after online conversion)
- Microsoft Excel 2021 supports ODF 1.3 (Windows and MacOS)
- Microsoft Excel 2024 supports ODF 1.4 (Windows and MacOS)
- Microsoft 365 Excel app supports ODF 1.4
- OnlyOffice online and desktop editors, both online and offline suites support ODF for opening, editing and exporting.
- OpenOffice Calc – full support from 2.0, import-only in 1.1.5.
  - NeoOffice – native support from 2.0 (OpenOffice.org 2.0.3 derivative), import only in 1.2.2 (OpenOffice.org 1.1.5 derivative).
  - StarOffice 8+ Calc (OpenOffice 2.0 derivative; Development discontinued).
- Zoho Sheet, an online spreadsheet application, can import and export ODS format.

=== Other applications ===
- Oxygen XML Editor 9.3+ allows users to extract, validate, edit, transform (using XSLT or XQuery) to other file formats, compare and process the XML data stored in OpenDocument files. Validation uses the latest ODF Documents version 1.1 Relax NG Schemas.
- IBM WebSphere Portal 6.0.1+ can preview texts from ODS files as HTML documents.
- odsgenerator v1.8.0+ allows generation of ODS files from JSON or YAML files.

==== Data management ====
- phpMyAdmin 2.9.0+ – database manager, exports to ODS, exports to system32\windows.

==== Knowledge management ====
- Knomos 1.0 – Law office management application.
- EndNote X 1.0.1 – Reference management software.

==== Statistics ====
- gretl 1.7.0 – Statistical analysis software (import only).

==== Translation support ====
- OmegaT — Allows translation of comments and sheet names.

== Presentation documents (.odp) ==
=== Presentation ===
- Calligra Stage uses ODP as default file format.
- Collabora Office Impress for Mobile and Desktop apps uses ODP as its native file format.
- Collabora Online Impress uses ODP as its native file format.
- FileApp allows viewing OpenDocument files on iPhone and iPad.
- IBM Lotus Notes 8.0+ includes an office suite for creating text, spreadsheet and presentation files.
- IBM Lotus Symphony Presentations 1.0+ (OpenOffice.org 1.0 derivative; Development discontinued).
- IBM Lotus Symphony Viewer allows viewing OpenDocument texts, spreadsheets and presentations on iPad and iPhone.
- JustSystems JUST Suite 2009 Agree (Japanese).
- LibreOffice Impress uses ODP as its native file format.
- LibreOffice Online Impress uses ODP as its native file format.
- Microsoft Powerpoint 2003 and Office XP Powerpoint (with the Open Source OpenXML/ODF Translator Add-in for Office)
- Microsoft Powerpoint 2007 (with Service Pack 2 or 3) supports ODF 1.1 (Windows only)
- Microsoft Powerpoint 2010 supports ODF 1.1 (Windows only)
- Microsoft Powerpoint 2013 supports ODF 1.2 (Windows only)
- Microsoft Powerpoint 2016 and Microsoft Powerpoint 2019 support ODF 1.2 (Windows: read/write; OS X: read-only after online conversion)
- Microsoft Powerpoint 2021 supports ODF 1.3 (Windows and MacOS)
- Microsoft Powerpoint 2024 supports ODF 1.4 (Windows and MacOS)
- Microsoft 365 Powerpoint app supports ODF 1.4
- OnlyOffice online and desktop editors, where both online and offline suites support ODF for opening, editing and exporting.
- OpenOffice Impress – native support from 2.0, import-only in 1.1.5.
  - NeoOffice 1.2 Impress (OpenOffice 1.1.5 derivative).
  - NeoOffice 2.0 Impress (OpenOffice 2.0.3 derivative).
  - StarOffice 8 Impress (OpenOffice 2.0 derivative; Development discontinued).
- WPS Office WPS Presentation support ppt, pot, pps, dps, dpt, pptx, potx, ppsx, pptm, potm, ppsm, dpss.
- Zoho Show, an online presentation program, can import/export ODP format files.

=== Other applications ===
- Oxygen XML Editor 9.3+ allows users to extract, validate, edit, transform (using XSLT or XQuery) to other file formats, compare and process the XML data stored in OpenDocument files. Validation uses the latest ODF Documents version 1.1 Relax NG Schemas.
- IBM WebSphere Portal 6.0.1+ can preview texts from ODP files as HTML documents.

== Database documents (.odb) ==
=== Database ===
- LibreOffice Base (an OpenOffice.org fork)

== Graphics documents (.odg) ==
- Collabora Office Draw allows read/write of ODG files.
- Collabora Online Draw can read/write ODG files.
- Karbon, vector graphics editor, part of Calligra Suite — OpenDocument support since 1.5+ (import and export).
- LibreOffice Draw uses ODG as its native file format.
- JustSystems JUST Suite 2008+ Hanako (Japanese).
- OpenOffice Draw – full support from 2.0, import-only in 1.1.5.
  - NeoOffice Draw – full support from 2.0 (OpenOffice.org 2.0.3 derivative), import only in 1.2.2 (OpenOffice.org 1.1.5 derivative).
  - StarOffice 8 Draw (OpenOffice 2.0 derivative; Development discontinued).
- Scribus 1.2.2+ (import only) — Desktop publishing application.
- Inkscape 0.44+ (export only) — vector graphics editor.

=== Other applications ===
- IBM WebSphere Portal 6.0.1+ can preview texts from ODG files as HTML documents.

== Formula documents (.odf) ==
- KFormula 1.5+ (full native support).
- LibreOffice Math — Allows read/write of ODF files.
- Collabora Office for Desktop apps uses ODF as its native file format.
- Math uses ODF as its native file format.
- OpenOffice Math (full support from 2.0).
  - NeoOffice 2.0 Math (OpenOffice 2.0.3 derivative).

== Search tools ==
- Google supports searching in content of ODT, ODS, and ODP files and also searching for these filetypes. Found files can be viewed directly in a converted HTML view.
- Google Desktop Search has an unofficial OpenDocument plug-in available, supporting ODT, OTT, ODG, OTG, ODP, OTP, ODS, OTS, and ODF OpenDocument formats. The plug-in does not correctly handle Unicode characters.
- Apple Spotlight (built into OS X 10.4 and later) supports indexed searching of OpenDocument files using a third-party plug-in from the NeoOffice team.
- Copernic Desktop Search (Windows).

== Other planned support ==
- Ability Office developers declared planned ODF support for the next major version of their office suite.
- Evermore Integrated Office – EIOffice 2009 will support ODF in the update. As stated on Evermore Software website: "Work is underway to both read and write to this new format as well as *.pdf and *.odf file formats in the update." Last version of EIOffice 2009 (5.0.1272.101EN.L1) cannot open or save ODF files.
- Haansoft's Hangul Word Processor will support OpenDocument format documents in its next version for Windows, which is planned for the end of 2009.
- An extension for Mozilla Firefox has been proposed by a developer named Tallinn, according to Mozilla hacker Gervase Markham (source); it has since been further modified by Alex Hudson. and was hosted in the official Firefox extension repository.
- Wikipedia announced that it will use ODF for printing wikis.
- BlackBerry smartphones are going to support ODF in their embedded office suites, starting mid-2009.
- The WordPad editor in Windows 7 includes support for ODF.

== Programmatic support, filters, converters ==
There are OpenDocument-oriented libraries available for languages such as Java, Python, Ruby, C++ and C#. OpenDoc Society maintains an extensive list of ODF software libraries for OpenDocument Format.

OpenDocument packages are ordinary zip files. There is an OpenDocument format which is just a single XML file, but most applications use the package format. Thus, any of the vast number of tools for handling zip files and XML data can be used to handle OpenDocument. Nearly all programming languages have libraries (built-in or available) for processing XML files and zip files.

=== Microsoft ===
Microsoft has been offering native support for ODF since Office 2007 Service Pack 2. Microsoft hosted the 8th ODF Plugfest in Brussels in 2012.

In October 2005, one year before the Microsoft Office 2007 suite was released, Microsoft declared that there is not sufficient demand from Microsoft customers for international standard OpenDocument format support and therefore it will not be included in Microsoft Office 2007. This statement was repeated also in next months. As an answer, on 20 October 2005 an online petition was created to demand ODF support from Microsoft. The petition was signed by circa 12000 people.

In May 2006, ODF plugin for Microsoft Office was released by OpenDocument Foundation. Microsoft declared that the company did not work with the developers of the plug-in.

In July 2006 Microsoft announced the creation of the Open XML Translator project—tools to build a technical bridge between the Microsoft Office Open XML Formats and the OpenDocument Format (ODF). This work was started in response to government requests for interoperability with ODF. The goal of project is not to implement ODF direct to Microsoft Office, but only to create plugin and external tools. In February 2007, this project released first version of ODF plug-in for Microsoft Word.

In February 2007 SUN released initial version of SUN ODF plugin for Microsoft Office. Version 1.0 was released in July 2007.

Microsoft Office 2007 Service Pack 2 was released on 28 April 2009. It added native support of OpenDocument 1.1 as well as other formats like XPS and PDF.

In April 2012, Microsoft announced support for ODF 1.2 in Microsoft Office 2013. Microsoft Office 2021 supports ODF 1.3 (Windows and MacOS).

Microsoft has financed the creation of an Open XML translator, to enable the conversion of documents between Office Open XML and OpenDocument. The project, hosted on SourceForge, is an effort by several of Microsoft's partners to create a plugin for Microsoft Office that will be freely available under a BSD license. By December 2007, plugins had been released for Microsoft Word, Microsoft Excel and Microsoft PowerPoint. Independent analysis has, however, reported several concerns with these plugins, including lack of support for Office 2007.

==== Third party support: Plug-ins for Microsoft Office ====
Sun Microsystems' ODF Plugin for Microsoft Office users (download link no longer available as of 30 March 2013)— was a plugin that allowed users to read and edit ISO-standard Open Document Format (ODF) files in Microsoft Office. It works with Microsoft Office 2007 (with service pack 1 or higher), Microsoft Office 2003, Microsoft Office XP, and even Microsoft Office 2000.

ooo-word-filter was a plugin that allowed users to open ODF files in Microsoft Office 2003.

OpenOpenOffice (O3), is apparently inactive. OpenOpenOffice was developed by Phase-n, a free and open source software plug-in to enable Microsoft Office to read and write OpenDocument files (and any other formats supported by OpenOffice.org). Instead of installing a complete office application or even a large plug-in, O3 intended to install a tiny plug-in to the Microsoft Office system. This tiny plug-in intended to automatically send the file to some server, which would then do the conversion, returning the converted file. The server could be local to an organization (so private information doesn't go over the Internet) or accessed via the Internet (for those who do not want to set up a server). A beta of the server half has been completed, and further expected announcements have not occurred. Phase-n argued that the main advantage of their approach is simplicity. Their website announces that O3 "requires no new concepts to be explored, no significant development, and leverages the huge existing body of work already created by the OpenOffice developers, the CPAN module authors, and the Microsoft .NET and Office teams. They also argue that this approach significantly simplifies maintenance; when a new version of OpenOffice is released, only the server needs to be upgraded.

The OpenDocument Foundation announced plans to develop a plugin for Microsoft Office in May 2006 but development was stopped in October 2007.

==== Microsoft Office 2007 SP2 support controversy ====
Microsoft supports OpenDocument format in Office 2007 SP2. The current implementation faces criticism for not supporting encrypted documents and formula format in the same way as other OpenDocument compatible software, as well as for stripping out formulas in imported spreadsheets created by other OpenDocument compatible software. Critics say that with this conflict of standards Microsoft actually managed to reduce interoperability between office productivity software. The company had previously reportedly stated that "where ODF 1.1 is ambiguous or incomplete, the Office implementation can be guided by current practice in OpenOffice.org, mainly, and other implementations including KOffice and AbiWord. Peter Amstein and the Microsoft Office team are reluctant to make liberal use of extension mechanisms, even though provided in ODF 1.1. They want to avoid all appearance of an embrace-extend attempt." However, according to the ODF Alliance, "ODF spreadsheets created in Excel 2007 SP2 do not in fact conform to ODF 1.1 because Excel 2007 incorrectly encodes formulas with cell addresses. Section 8.3.1 of ODF 1.1 says that addresses in formulas "start with a "[" and end with a "]"." In Excel 2007, cell addresses were not enclosed with the necessary square brackets, which could be easily corrected." This however has been contested as the ISO/IEC 26300 specification states that the semantics and the syntax is dependent on the used namespace which is implementation dependent leaving the syntax implementation defined as well.

Before SP2, Microsoft had sponsored the creation of the Open XML translator project to allow the conversion of documents between OOXML and OpenDocument. As a result of this project, Microsoft financed the ODF add-in for Word project on SourceForge. This project is an effort by several of Microsoft's partners to create a plugin for Microsoft Office that will be freely available under a BSD license. The project released version 1.0 for Microsoft Word of this software in January 2007 followed by versions for Microsoft Excel and Microsoft PowerPoint in December of the same year. Sun Microsystems has created the competing OpenDocument plugin for Microsoft Office 2007 (Service Pack 1 or higher), 2000, XP, and 2003 that supports Word, Excel, and PowerPoint documents. The ODF Alliance has claimed that third-party plug-ins "provide better support for ODF than the recently released Microsoft Office 2007 SP2".

== Accessibility ==
One important issue raised in the discussion of OpenDocument is whether the format is accessible to those with disabilities. There are two issues: does the specification support accessibility, and are implementations accessible?

=== Specification ===
While the specification of OpenDocument is going through an extensive accessibility review, many of the components it is built on (such as SMIL for audio and multimedia and SVG for vector graphics) have already gone through the World Wide Web Consortium (W3C)'s Web Accessibility Initiative processes.

There are already applications that currently read/write OpenDocument that export Tagged PDF files (to support PDF accessibility); this suggests that much or all of the necessary data for accessibility is already included in the OpenDocument format.

The OASIS OpenDocument technical committee released a draft of OpenDocument 1.1 on 27 July 2006, for public comment through 25 September 2006. This is a minor update to the specification to add accessibility information, mainly soft page break markings, table header markings, presentation navigation markings, alternative text and captions, and specifically stating that spreadsheets may be embedded in presentations. Peter Korn (an accessibility expert) reviewed version 1.1 "to satisfy myself that all of our accessibility concerns have been addressed", and declared "I am so satisfied."

=== Implementations ===
Peter Korn gave an in-depth report on OpenDocument accessibility. He noted that there are many kinds of impairments, including visual (minor, major, or blind), physical (minor, major with vocal control, major without vocal control), auditory, and cognitive. He then noted that the situation varies, depending on the specific disability. For a vast number of disabilities, there are no known problems, though.

- OpenOffice is expected to work well with existing solutions in MS Windows' on-screen keyboards (etc.) when driven by single-switch access, head-mouse, and eye-gaze systems. On Unix-like systems, GNOME's "On-screen Keyboard" can be used. Also available on both Linux and Windows systems is Dasher, a text-entry alternative released under the GPL for head-mouse and eye-gaze users (35+ word-per-minute typing speeds using nothing but eye movement are possible).
- If those with disabilities are already using Microsoft Office, then a plug-in enabling them to load and save OpenDocument files using Microsoft Office may give them the same capabilities they already have (assuming the opening/saving cycle is accessible). So from that perspective, OpenDocument is at least as accessible as Microsoft Office.
- For users using alternatives to Microsoft Office there may be problems, not necessarily due to the ODF file format but rather due to the lower investment to date by assistive technology vendors on these platforms, though there is ongoing work. For example, IBM has stated that its "Workplace productivity tools available through Workplace Managed Client including word processing, spreadsheet and presentation editors are currently planned to be fully accessible on a Windows platform by 2007. Additionally, these productivity tools are currently planned to be fully accessible on a Linux platform by 2008" (Sutor, 10 November 2005).

Since OpenDocument is an Open Standard file format, there is no need for everyone to use the same program to read and write OpenDocument files; someone with a disability is free to use whatever program works best for them.

== See also ==
- Comparison of OpenDocument software
- Network effect
- Open format
- Office suite
- Office Open XML
