= Writer2epub =

Text processing extension

Writer2ePub
- Original author: Luca "Luke" Calcinai
- Initial release: 2009; 17 years ago
- Stable release: 1.1.28 / 21 July 2014; 11 years ago
- Written in: OpenOffice Basic
- Platform: OpenOffice.org, Apache OpenOffice, LibreOffice, NeoOffice
- Size: 1.31 MB
- Standards: EPUB, OpenDocument
- Available in: 14 (Note: Strings for Writer2ePub's user interface are stored in a DialogStrings_xx_XX.properties file, with "xx_XX" standing for the standard language identification like e.g. en_US. The program contains 14 localizations in release 1.1.28.) languages
- Type: Desktop publishing software
- License: GNU Lesser General Public License 2.1
- Website: writer2epub.it/en/

Writer2ePub (W2E) is a free extension for the various implementations of the Writer text processor (Note: Writer2ePub works with OpenOffice.org, Apache OpenOffice, LibreOffice and NeoOffice.) to create EPUB-formatted e-Books "from any file format that Writer can read". A text to be exported as EPUB has to be saved as OpenDocument (ODT)-formatted text document. Writer2epub is written in OpenOffice Basic. The author of Writer2ePub is Luca "Luke" Calcinai.
