= IBM Workplace =

Family of collaborative software

IBM Workplace is a discontinued brand of collaborative software applications from IBM's Lotus Software division. It was intended to be the next generation of collaboration software that would work with IBM's Java EE-based WebSphere Portal server software. Introduced in 2003, the brand was largely disbanded by 2007, with its core technologies and many of its products rebranded as Lotus or WebSphere.

== History ==
In 2002 at Lotusphere, IBM's annual conference for Lotus customers, IBM's Lotus division announced its Java EE-based "NextGen" initiative. This became the Workplace brand, which IBM first introduced at Lotusphere 2003. The first Workplace product is Workplace Messaging, a lightweight e-mail solution. More Workplace applications were introduced later, such as instant messaging and document management. In 2004, Workplace 2.0 was released, to run inside of a desktop rich client and in a web browser.

Because the goal of Workplace largely overlapped IBM's existing Lotus Notes and Domino software, Notes and Domino customers became increasingly worried that Notes and Domino would either be discontinued or at best marginalized in favor of Workplace. To assuage this fear, IBM demonstrated in 2005 plans for integrating Workplace products with Notes and Domino products. IBM also started to include Lotus Notes and Domino within the "Workplace family".

However, by 2007, most Workplace-branded products were being either discontinued (such as Workplace Messaging) or rebranded as Lotus or WebSphere. Mike Rhodin, general manager of Lotus Software, said that Workplace was a way to shake up the Lotus team into creating innovative technologies, and now that technologies had been created, they were being folded back into the core brands. Lotus also heard that having the Workplace brand in addition to its other brands was confusing.

== Foundational Technologies ==
IBM Workplace Client Technology is a defunct application platform built on top of the Eclipse Rich Client Platform (RCP) 3.0, which itself is written in Java. It provides tools to manage rich clients, such as synchronization so that clients can work with data offline, and provisioning so that servers can automatically push down the latest version of applications onto clients.

Workplace Client Technology has evolved into IBM Lotus Expeditor.

== Products ==
=== IBM Workplace Collaboration Services ===
IBM Workplace Collaboration Services is a single product providing a set of communication and collaboration tools such as e-mail, calendaring and scheduling, awareness, instant messaging, e-learning, team spaces, Web conferencing, and document and Web content management.

IBM ended support for Workplace Collaboration Services on September 30, 2009. It has been superseded largely by Lotus-branded products, such as Notes, Domino, Sametime, Quickr, and Connections.

=== IBM Workplace Managed Client ===
IBM Workplace Managed Client is a server-managed rich client for IBM Workplace Collaboration Services. It has offline support for email, calendaring, scheduling, and document management. It has a plug-in for running Lotus Notes 7 applications, and a set of productivity tools for office documents, forked from OpenOffice.org 1.1.4 (the last version released under the Sun Industry Standards Source License). Version 2.6 was released January 23, 2006.

Workplace Managed Client introduced a collaboration tool called Activity Explorer. It let teams of users manage projects via an object hierarchy, which groups together information objects (such as files, messages, and web links) that are related to an ongoing project and are shared among team members.

Workplace Managed Client is no longer being actively marketed. It was superseded by Lotus Notes, Domino and Symphony. Activity Explorer functionality is now part of IBM Lotus Connections.

=== IBM Workplace Forms ===
IBM Workplace Forms is a suite of products for developing and delivering data-driven, XML-based electronic forms to end-users. The product is now known as IBM Lotus Forms.
