= IBM Lotus Symphony =

Office suite for Windows, Macintosh and Linux

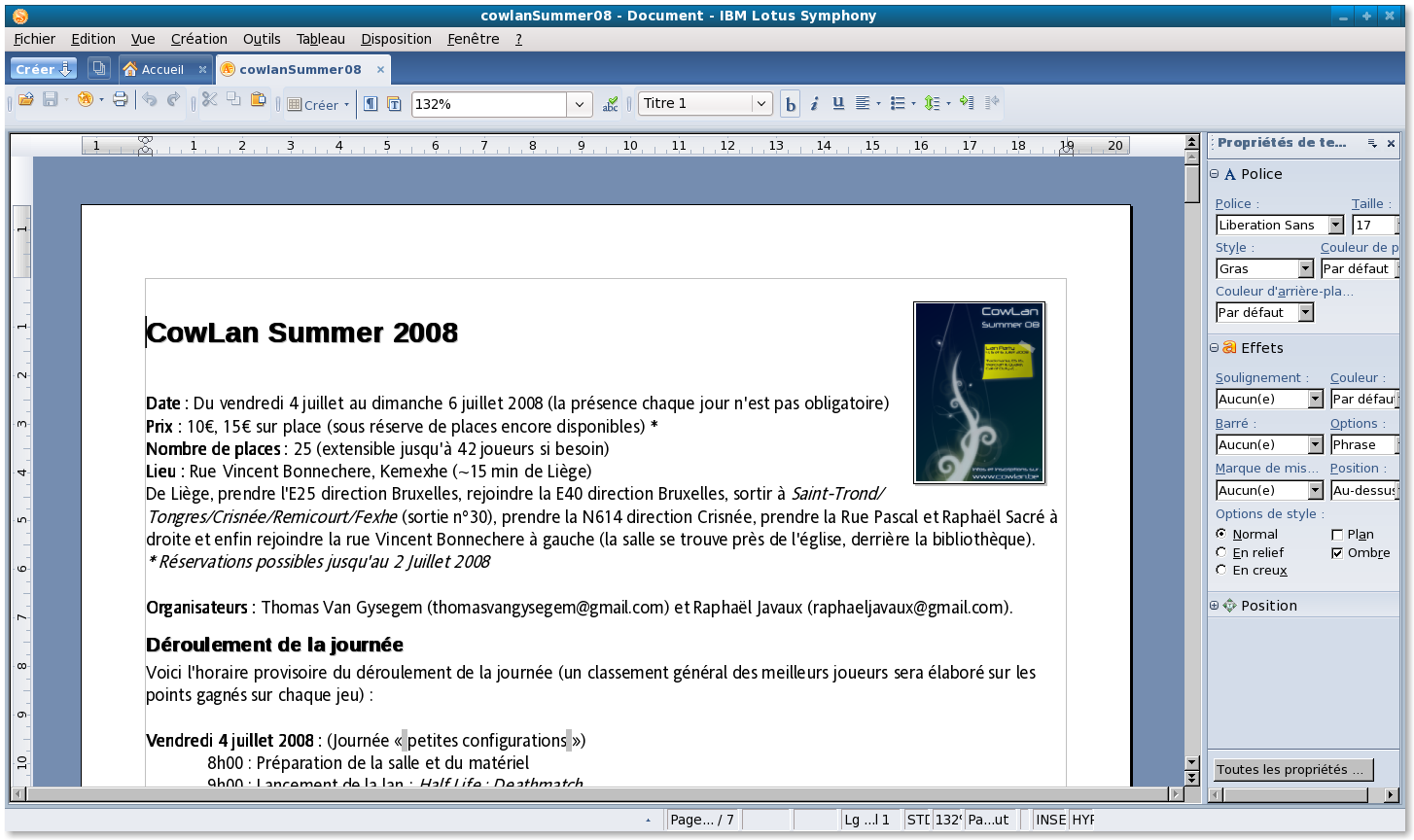
- Developer: IBM
- Release: 2007; 19 years ago
- Final release: 3.0.1 FP2 / 29 November 2012
- Preview release: 3.0 Beta 4 / 26 August 2010
- Operating system: Linux, Windows, and Mac OS X.
- Type: Office suite, web browser
- License: Freeware (initially commercial software)

IBM Lotus Symphony is a discontinued suite of applications for creating, editing, and sharing text, spreadsheet, presentations, and other documents and browsing the World Wide Web. It was first distributed as commercial proprietary software, then as freeware, before IBM contributed the suite to the Apache Software Foundation in 2014 for inclusion in the free and open-source Apache OpenOffice software suite.

First released in 2007, the suite has a name similar to the 1980s DOS Lotus Symphony suite, but the two software suites are otherwise unrelated. The previous Lotus application suite, Lotus SmartSuite, is also unrelated.

IBM discontinued development of Lotus Symphony in January 2012 with the final release of version 3.0.1, moving future development effort to Apache OpenOffice, and donating the source code to the Apache Software Foundation.

== Features ==
IBM Lotus Symphony consists of:

- IBM Lotus Symphony Documents, a word processor program
- IBM Lotus Symphony Spreadsheets, a spreadsheet program
- IBM Lotus Symphony Presentations, a presentation program
- A Web browser based on Firefox 3

Each application is split into tabs.

Symphony supports the OpenDocument formats as well as the binary Microsoft Office formats. It can also export Portable Document Format (PDF) files and import Office Open XML files. Previous support for Lotus SmartSuite formats was disabled in Symphony 3.

Symphony is based on Eclipse Rich Client Platform from IBM Lotus Expeditor (the shell) and OpenOffice.org 3 (the core office-suite code).

In 2009, IBM created development tools for BlackBerry smartphones to link to IBM's business software, which also allow opening ODF file-formats, following a full Symphony later.

Lotus Symphony 3.0.1 added enhancements including support for one million spreadsheet rows, bubble charts, and a new design for the home page. On 27 March 2012 a first fixpack update for Lotus Symphony 3.0.1 was released. On 29 November 2012 a second fixpack update for Lotus Symphony 3.0.1 was released.

A web based version of Symphony, called LotusLive Symphony, was launched in 2011.

== History ==
Symphony has its roots in the IBM Workplace Managed Client component of IBM Workplace. In 2006, IBM introduced Workplace Managed Client version 2.6, which included "productivity tools"—a word processor, spreadsheet, and presentation program—that supported ODF. Workplace used code from OpenOffice.org version 1.1.4, the last version released under the Sun Industry Standards Source License, which allowed for release of binaries of modified versions without releasing changes.

Later in 2006, IBM announced that Lotus Notes 8, which already incorporated Workplace technology, would also include the same productivity tools as the Workplace Managed Client. In 2007, IBM released Notes 8, and then released Notes' productivity tools as a standalone application, Symphony, in a beta one month later. The code in Symphony is the same as that for Notes 8's productivity tools. IBM released version 1.0 of Lotus Symphony in May 2008 as a free download, and introduced three minor upgrades through 2008 and 2009.

In 2010, IBM released version 3.0. Symphony 3.0 was based on OpenOffice.org 3.0, though not under the LGPL but under a special arrangement between IBM and Sun (who required copyright assignment of all outside OpenOffice.org contributions). and includes enhancements such as new sidebars in its user interface and support for Visual Basic for Applications macros, OpenDocument Format 1.2, and OLE. Symphony 3.0 was originally planned to include other existing OpenOffice.org modules, including an equation editor, database software, and a drawing program.

The software was developed by IBM China Development Laboratory, located in Beijing, which later for a brief time developed Apache OpenOffice.

On 13 July 2011, IBM announced that it would donate Lotus Symphony to the Apache Foundation. On 23 January 2012, IBM announced version 3.0.1 would be the last version of Lotus Symphony and their efforts would be going into the Apache OpenOffice project, including the Symphony user interface. IBM planned to release an "Apache OpenOffice IBM Edition" after the release of Apache OpenOffice 4, but later decided that it would offer the stock Apache OpenOffice with IBM extensions.

Lotus Symphony Documents 1.0 on Windows XP

There were complaints that IBM and the Apache Software Foundation did not really provide an open source release of the Lotus Symphony code, although IBM promised to donate the code to Apache. It was reported that some LibreOffice developers wanted to adopt some code parts and bug fixes which IBM already fixed in their OpenOffice fork.

Lotus Symphony Documents 1.2 Beta on Mac OS X

== Usage share ==
During the Lotusphere event in 2009, IBM confirmed its cost-reduction effort using Lotus Symphony, with the company migrating its 400,000 users from Microsoft Office to Lotus Symphony. In June 2008 IBM urged its 20,000 'strong-techies' employees to use Symphony instead of Microsoft Office and later in September 2009 IBM forced all 360,000 employees to use Symphony.

In March 2009, a study showed that Lotus Symphony had a 2% market share in the corporate market.

As of February 2010, IBM stated that Lotus Symphony had 12 million users with 50 million downloads in January 2011.

== Version release dates ==
Beta 1
- Released on 18 September 2007

Beta 2
- Released on 5 November 2007

Beta 3
- Released on 17 December 2007
- Released in 23 languages on 7 January 2008

Beta 4
- Released on 1 February 2008. Introduced the Lotus Symphony Developer Toolkit.
- Revised edition released on 3 March 2008

Version 1.0
- Released on 30 May 2008

Version 1.1
- Released on 29 August 2008

Version 1.2
- Released on 4 November 2008
- Revised edition released on 23 February 2009

Version 1.3
- Released on 10 June 2009
- Revised edition released on 1 September 2009

Version 3 Beta
- Released on 4 February 2010

Version 3 Beta 2
- Released on 4 February 2010
- Features: Visual Basic macros, OLE Objects and embedded audio/video; support for nested tables, presentation masters and DataPilot tables for pivoting on large datasets.

Version 3 Beta 3
- Released on 7 June 2010

Version 3 Beta 4
- Released on 26 August 2010

Version 3.0
- Released 21 October 2010

Version 3.0 FixPack 1
- Released 13 January 2011

Version 3.0 FixPack 2
- Released 20 April 2011

Version 3.0 FixPack 3
- Released 20 July 2011

Version 3.0.1
- Released 23 January 2012

Version 3.0.1 FixPack 1
- Released 27 March 2012

Version 3.0.1 FixPack 2
- Released 29 November 2012

A timeline of major derivatives of: StarOffice and OpenOffice.org
IBM Lotus Symphony

== See also ==
- Office Open XML software
- OpenDocument software
