= .stw =

.stw may refer to:

- NeoOffice#Word processor application
- OpenOffice.org XML#File formats
