= Go-oo =

Discontinued office suite software

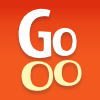

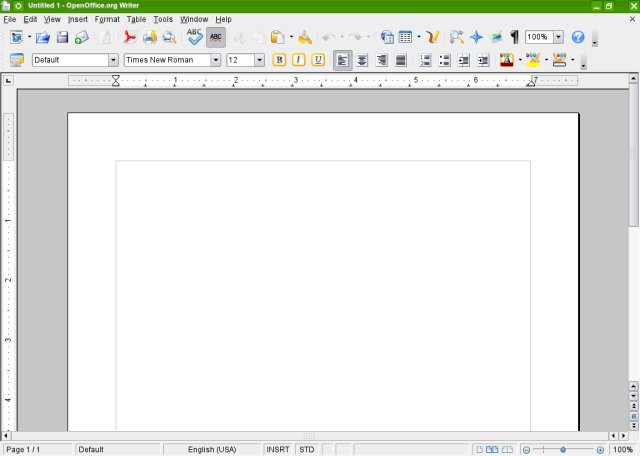
- Go-oo version of OpenOffice.org Writer on OpenSUSE 11
- Developer: Novell
- Initial release: 2.3.0 / October 8, 2007; 18 years ago
- Final release: 3.2.1 / July 21, 2010; 15 years ago
- Written in: C++, Mono
- Operating system: Linux, Mac OS X, and Windows
- Type: Office suite
- License: GNU Lesser General Public License
- Website: go-oo.org (defunct)

Go-oo (short for Go-Open Office) was a free and open-source office productivity software suite developed and sponsored by Novell. It originated as a set of patches to OpenOffice.org known as ooo-build developed in 2003 by the Linux software company Ximian and led by Michael Meeks. In October 2007 Go-oo was released as an independent fork with additional features. Go-oo incorporated enhancements not accepted by the upstream project, which was maintained by Sun Microsystems, and offered improved support for Microsoft Office formats, faster development cycles, and more permissive policies for accepting external contributions. The project was discontinued in 2010 following the creation of LibreOffice, which integrated most of its features and policies.

== History ==
Go-oo began in 2003 as a patch set for OpenOffice.org, developed by Ximian, which was later acquired by Novell. The patch set, called ooo-build, was created to make OpenOffice.org easier to build on Linux distributions and to include improvements submitted by the community that were not accepted by Sun Microsystems, the project's upstream maintainer.

By 2005, the project had adopted the domain name go-oo.org, and in October 2007 Novell released the first standalone version of Go-oo (version 2.3.0). From that point on, Linux distributions such as SUSE Linux, Debian, and Ubuntu began using Go-oo rather than the unmodified upstream source. Several Windows-based editions, including OxygenOffice and the OpenOffice.org Novell Edition, were also built on Go-oo.

Go-oo included a number of features not present in OpenOffice.org, such as better support for Microsoft's Office Open XML (OOXML) formats, including limited write capability, "hybrid PDF" export (PDFs with embedded source files), and the Sun Presentation Minimizer. Go-oo's more permissive contribution policies encouraged wider community involvement, in contrast to the stricter practices of Sun Microsystems.

However, Go-oo faced criticism from some members of the free and open-source software community, concerned about Go-oo's inclusion of Microsoft technologies (including support for Visual Basic for Applications, OOXML and Microsoft Works file formats), and the use of the Mono programming language, controlled by Novell. They argued that these features could introduce software patent risks and compromise interoperability. Some also suggested that Go-oo's enhancements may have been shaped by Novell's 2006 partnership announcement with Microsoft, which was later found to have imposed limitations on interoperability features in Go-oo.

In September 2010, The Document Foundation announced the creation of LibreOffice as a full fork of OpenOffice.org, with many of Go-oo's developers and code contributions forming the foundation of the new project. Go-oo was deprecated in favor of LibreOffice, which adopted many of its patches, features, and governance policies. LibreOffice also abandoned the use of the Mono programming language.

LibreOffice and its enterprise-focused derivative, Collabora Online, are considered the principal successors of the Go-oo codebase.

A timeline of major derivatives of: StarOffice and OpenOffice.org
Go-oo

=== Versions ===
Stable builds of Go-oo were usually available a couple of days after OpenOffice.org stable builds. Windows builds had a different last number in the version's number than Linux builds. A stable version for Macintosh computers was available starting with version 3.1.0 released in May 2009.

Version	Windows release	Linux release	MacOS X release
2.3.0	October 8, 2007	November 14, 2007	—N/a
2.4.0	April 30, 2008	February 20, 2008	—N/a
2.4.1	June 10, 2008	June 26, 2008	—N/a
3.0.0	October 22, 2008	November 21, 2008	—N/a
3.0.1	February 4, 2009		—N/a
3.1.0	June 2, 2009		May 28, 2009
3.1.1	September 16, 2009	September 5, 2009	September 4, 2009
3.2.0	February 26, 2010		
3.2.1	July 21, 2010		June 4, 2010

== Differences between OpenOffice.org and Go-oo ==
=== Advantages ===
- Go-oo works faster in some operations than OpenOffice.org. This makes it perform faster than OpenOffice.org.
- The OpenOffice.org 3.0 installation no longer includes a large number of dictionaries for writing aids (spell checker, hyphenation and thesaurus), as this impacted application performance. Localised releases may include dictionaries for particular primary and secondary languages. Dictionaries are now available as downloadable extensions, separately for each language. Go-oo installation from version 3 on includes dictionaries in many languages, as a single extension, being a part of installation files. Inclusion of a large number of dictionaries in a default installation may affect performance.
- Better GTK+ integration.
- Better Chinese font rendering.

==== Features ====
- Go-oo includes 3-D transition effects in Presentations (Linux).
- Use of the GStreamer multimedia framework in Linux for multimedia content;
- Use of Mono framework for UNO automation, allowing automation from other languages such as C#, Boo, and so on.
- Go-oo uses a combo box in place of the zoom button in stock OpenOffice.org. Newer OOo 2.x feature releases have a clickable status bar item for a zoom menu. A zoom slider was introduced to OOo 3.0 Writer and later added to OOo 3.1 Calc, Impress and Draw components.
- Go-oo Calc can set color for sheet tab label.
- Go-oo Calc 2.4.x has a built in function called "Solver". It is a little different from the Solver function of the same name, which is available from OpenOffice.org 3.0. OpenOffice.org 2.4.x has no Solver.

==== Filetype support ====
- Go-oo can write OOXML files, and not just read them.

Import

- Go-oo 2.4.x has built-in support for opening Office Open XML files and brings this function also for Windows 98/ME users. (Note: OpenOffice.org 3.x has built-in support for opening Office Open XML documents, but those versions of OOo cannot be installed under Windows 98/ME.)
- VBA macro support;
- Microsoft Works filetype import;
- Lotus Word Pro import;
- Go-oo Draw has built-in functionality to open SVG files. OpenOffice Draw requires an extension.
- The PDF Import extension is included by default in Go-oo 3.0.
- Improved EMF drawing;
- WordPerfect Graphics import.

Save/Export

- From version 3.0 on, Go-oo can save password-protected XLS files. It uses only one basic encryption method compatible with many spreadsheet applications (for example Gnumeric).
- Go-oo 3.x can save Office Open XML files such as docx, xlsx, pptx by using Novell OpenXML Converter. Because Go-oo for Windows and OpenOffice.org Novell Edition for Windows are similar, Novell OpenXML Converter can work with Go-oo 3.x.

=== Disadvantages ===
- Go-oo localizations are available only as language packs to the English installation. Translations of the user interface and dictionaries for different languages in Go-oo are in some cases not the same as in OpenOffice.org.

=== Other differences ===
- Go-oo installation files were usually available for download a couple of days after OpenOffice.org builds were released.
- Go-oo for Windows was similar to OpenOffice.org Novell Edition for Windows. For example, Go-oo has version 3.0-19 and Novell Edition 3.0-22.
- The first time OpenOffice.org is started, a wizard opens to guide a user through the setting of user name and the registration process. This wizard is disabled in Go-oo.

== See also ==
- List of word processors
- Comparison of word processors
- Office Open XML software
- OpenDocument software
