= TechWriter =

Proprietary word-processing app for RISC OS computers

- Developer(s): Icon Technology Ltd / MW Software / Acorn Computers
- Initial release: 1991; 34 years ago
- Stable release: 9.12 / 24 September 2013; 11 years ago
- Written in: C++
- Operating system: RISC OS
- Available in: Multilingual
- Type: Document processor
- License: Proprietary
- Website: www.mw-software.com

TechWriter and EasiWriter are closed source proprietary word processor applications for RISC OS computers.

Essentially they have the same feature set, except that TechWriter has more features that are specifically aimed at Technical Writers such as the ability to edit mathematical formulae and insert Greek characters.

The default file format is proprietary; it is also possible since Version 8.9 to import Microsoft Word .docx documents and OpenOffice/LibreOffice .odt files. It is also possible to save in TeX, HTML, and PDF format.

== Development ==
Originally owned and developed by Icon Technology Ltd, in association with Acorn Computers, it is now developed by MW Software.

Due to the way in which RISC OS has developed slowly since the 1990s (see History of RISC OS) it has not attracted any of the main software companies such as Microsoft, IBM, Sun/Oracle or the various open-source communities so the availability of software commonly found on other platforms is limited. A handful of word processor applications exist such as FireWorkz and PipeDream (as well as the cut-down version of EasiWriter simply called Writer+).

As of 2015, LibreOffice or its equivalents are yet to be ported to the platform which means that to edit documents created on other platforms a version of EasiWriter or TechWriter are required.
