= Lotusphere =

American annual conference hosted by Lotus Software

Lotusphere was an American annual conference hosted by Lotus Development Corporation (which later became an IBM software brand) from 1993 to 2017. In 2013, Lotusphere was re-branded as IBM Connect.

Except for the first conference, which took place in December 1993, Lotusphere was held in late January. It started with a reception party on Sunday night and continued on through the closing session on Thursday afternoon. The conference was held at the Walt Disney World Swan and Dolphin hotels. Most years it has used the additional space at Disney's Yacht and Beach Clubs.

In addition to the annual conference in Florida, between 1997 and 2000 there was also an annual Lotusphere Europe conference, first in Nice (1997) and then in Berlin (1999).

"Lotusphere Comes to You" (LCTY) events were for a few years held by local IBM Business Partners, where some of the information presented at conference was presented and business partners could connect with local users who were not able to attend the big event. LCTY was held in over 50 countries around the world. Since 2007, LCTY in Sofia, Bulgaria was organized by IBS Bulgaria with the support of IBM Bulgaria. The event covered news around Lotus Development Corporation as well as sessions emphasizing on local business needs and Lotus Domino development. These events were later replaced by local LUG (Lotus User Group) events like IamLUG (later Icon US), MWLUG, ILUG, UKLUG (later Icon UK) and many others.

Toward the end of 2012, IBM stopped using the Lotus brand and renamed the conference to IBM Connect. It was renamed again in 2015 to IBM ConnectED, but changed back to IBM Connect in 2016. The venue changed from the Disney Swan and Dolphin to the Hilton in Orlando. In 2017 the conference was moved to the Moscone Centre in San Francisco, and the date of the conference moved to the third week of February. In 2018, IBM Connect, along with several other IBM conferences, was merged into the IBM Think conference.

== Agenda ==
The typical agenda started with an opening general session on Monday, followed by breakout sessions through the rest of the morning and afternoon where different presentations occur simultaneously in different conference rooms, allowing attendees to choose which one they want to go to. Each breakout session was typically an hour long, with pauses in the schedule to allow attendees to mingle and walk to their next choice of breakout session. Tuesday and Wednesday also had six or seven of these breakout sessions throughout the day.

Originally, Thursday was the last day of the conference, with a few breakout sessions in the morning, then a large "Ask the Developers" session where attendees are allowed to ask questions directly to a panel of IBM/Lotus employees involved in making the software. The last event of the conference is a closing session. Starting in 2014 the conference was shortened one day, ending on Wednesday instead.

The opening and closing sessions typically had a form of entertainment and a guest speaker, as well as executives and key employees sharing news and demonstrations of what was planned for the near future.

=== Breakout Sessions ===
In 2008, there were 197 different presentations scheduled during the breakout sessions, scheduled across 18 slots, giving attendees an average of eleven choices per session slot. Each breakout session lasted about an hour. Breakouts were split into several categories called "tracks". Common tracks were:

1) Futures and Innovations
Glimpses of technologies and innovations coming out of IBM and Lotus Research Labs.
2) Application Development
Presentations on custom application development, ranging from paper prototyping to application development techniques specific to Lotus software products.
3) Planning and Managing Your Collaboration Infrastructure
Information for administrators and decision makers on architecture, features and capabilities, deployment, and system management.
4) Best Practices
Tips and tricks for developers, administrators, usually technical and tactical.

In addition to these four tracks, there was sometimes a fifth track with a title and content around "Customer References" or "Sponsor Sessions". There were also "Hands-on" and "JumpStart" sessions.

Hands-on
These were hands-on classes lasting 1¾ hours, taking place in rooms set up in a classroom style with tables and computers. Attendance was limited such that there are one to two attendees per computer.
JumpStart
JumpStart sessions were offered during the day on Sunday, usually lasting about 1½ hours, giving an in-depth presentation on a topic.

== History and statistics ==
Year	Location	Attendance	Theme phrase	Top messages	Host	Opening General Session guest(s)	Closing General Session guest(s)	Sunday night reception	Wednesday night party	CULT shirt
1993	Orlando, Florida, U.S.	2300	Working Together		Don Bulens	Geoffrey Moore			Disney-MGM	
1994	No Event									
1995	Orlando, Florida, U.S.		The Right Event. The Right Solutions. Right Now.						Disney-MGM	
1996	Orlando, Florida, U.S.		Release The Power	Notes R4; Work the Web		None	Cirque du Soleil		Universal Studios Florida; The Neville Brothers	
1997	Orlando, Florida, U.S.		Pool of Knowledge	Don't compete with, embrace the Web.; iNotes Web Publisher; Domino	Ray Ozzie	Avery Brooks			Magic Kingdom; The Doobie Brothers	
1998	Orlando, Florida, U.S.		Cultivate Your Senses	Notes R5	Steve Beckhardt (?)	Jamie Clark; Alan Hobson	Bill Nye		Disney-MGM; Earth, Wind & Fire	
1999	Orlando, Florida, U.S.		LOTUS: A Part of Every Solution	Notes R5; Knowledge Management	Jeff Papows	Jim Lovell; Gene Krantz	Marc Salem		SeaWorld; The Pointer Sisters	
2000	Orlando, Florida, U.S.	10000	Looking Forward/Forward Looking	Raven; Domino Access for Microsoft Outlook	Jeff Papows > Al Zollar	Walter Cronkite	The Raspyni Brothers		Universal's Islands of Adventure; Chicago	Notes World Order
2001	Orlando, Florida, U.S.	10000	In The Know	Lotus K-Station; Lotus Discovery Server	Al Zollar	Senator Al Franken; Francis Ford Coppola	Umbilical Brothers		Disney's Wide World of Sports Complex; Brian Setzer Orchestra	Domino Survivor
2002	Orlando, Florida, U.S.	6000	Proof Positive	Notes/Domino 6; "Lotus Software" brand; J2EE; "two-lane highway"	Al Zollar	Ben Stein	Kevin Nealon		Disney-MGM	Fellowship of the Domino Ring
2003	Orlando, Florida, U.S.		The Essential Human Element	NextGen; DB2	Al Zollar > Ambuj Goyal	Former Mayor Rudy Giuliani; Bounce (dancers)	Dr. Ronan Tynan		Magic Kingdom	Just-Us League & Collaboration League
2004	Orlando, Florida, U.S.	5273	The Workplace For Innovation		Ambuj Goyal	Patrick Stewart	Richard Jeni		Universal Studios Florida	CULT SHIRT ON HUMAN
2005	Orlando, Florida, U.S.	5800	Envision Decisions	Notes and Workplace convergence	Ambuj Goyal	John Cleese; Ray Ozzie	Steven Wright	Country/Western	Universal's Islands of Adventure	Zen of Collaboration
2006	Orlando, Florida, U.S.	6000	FutureInSight	Workplace; Activities; Sametime 7.5	Mike Rhodin	Jason Alexander	Jim Gaffigan	Poker tables	SeaWorld	CULT Man Group
2007	Orlando, Florida, U.S.	7000	IT Revolves Around You	Notes/Domino 8; Notes moving to Eclipse; Quickr; Connections; Save The Notes Client, Save The World	Mike Rhodin	Neil Armstrong; Ultrasonic Rock Orchestra	Dr. Neil deGrasse Tyson		Disney's Animal Kingdom	I AM _____
2008	Orlando, Florida, U.S.	7000+	Emergence	Notes/Domino 8.01, 8.5; Domino Designer in Eclipse; Lotus Mashups; Lotus Foundations; Lotus "Bluehouse"; Lotus Symphony	Mike Rhodin	Bob Costas; Orlando Symphony Orchestra	Alton Brown	Beach Party	Universal's Islands of Adventure	Pirates of Collaboration
2009	Orlando, Florida, U.S.		Resonance	LotusLive; Lotus Notes 8.5 for Mac; Alloy (SAP + Lotus Notes); xPages; DAOS; ID-vault	Bob Picciano	Dan Aykroyd; Blue Man Group	Benjamin Zander		Universal Studios	
2010	Orlando, Florida, U.S.		Lotus knows why. Lotus knows how.		Bob Picciano > Alistair Rennie	William Shatner; Nuttin' But Stringz	Brian Cox (physicist)		Hollywood Studios	
2011	Orlando, Florida, U.S.		Get Social. Do Business.		Alistair Rennie	Kevin Spacey; Mass Ensemble	Watson		Wizarding World of Harry Potter, Islands of Adventure	
2012	Orlando, Florida, U.S.		Business. Made Social.		Alistair Rennie	Michael J. Fox; OK Go	Andrew Zimmern		SeaWorld	No CULT Shirt
2013	Orlando, Florida, U.S.		Get social. Do business.		Alistair Rennie	Joe Gordon-Levitt; They Might Be Giants	Steven Strogatz; John Hodgman		Universal Studios Florida	No CULT Shirt
2014	Orlando, Florida, U.S.		Energizing Life's work.		Craig Hayman	Seth Meyers; American Authors	Dave Lavery		Hollywood Studios	No CULT Shirt
2015	Orlando, Florida, U.S.	3000	A new way to engage	IBM Verse; IBM Connections CR2	Jeff Schick	Philippe Petit	Arthur T. Benjamin	Beach party	n/a	No CULT Shirt
2016	Orlando, Florida, U.S. Hilton	2000	Make Every Moment Count	Project Toscana	Jeff Schick	Jason Silva	Erik Wahl		Universal Studios	No CULT Shirt
2017	San Francisco, CA, U.S. Moscone Center	2000	Redefine work with Watson	IBM Connections Pink; IBM Watson Work Services	Inhi Cho Suh	Dr. Sheena Iyengar	Eric Whitacre		Exploratorium	No CULT Shirt
