= Zoho Office Suite =

Productivity and collaboration software

- Developer: Zoho Corporation
- Type: Online office suite
- License: Proprietary
- Website: www.zoho.com/officesuite

Zoho Office Suite is an online office suite developed by Zoho Corporation.

== History ==
Zoho Office Suite was launched in 2005 with a web-based word processor. Additional products, such as those for spreadsheets and presentations, were incorporated later into the suite. The applications are distributed as software as a service (SaaS). The company later launched an email and collaboration suite, Zoho Workplace, which bundled the office suite along with email, meetings, chat, file management and others.

== Products ==
Zoho uses an open API for its Writer, Sheet, Show, Creator, Meeting, and Planner products. It also has plugins into Microsoft Word and Excel, an OpenOffice.org plugin, and a plugin for Firefox.

Zoho Office Suite is free for individuals but offers a plan for teams, which includes Zoho WorkDrive, Zoho Workplace and other Zoho apps.

In October 2009, Zoho integrated some of their applications with the Google Apps online suite.

== See also ==
- Comparison of office suites
- List of office suites
