= Knomos =

Knomos is a workflow and knowledge management application primarily for law firms to handle their cases, with a focus on the legal systems of Europe.

It is an open source (GNU GPL), web-based application.
