= HCL Connections =

Enterprise social software application

- Original author: IBM
- Developer: HCL Technologies
- Stable release: 8.0 / October 27, 2022; 3 years ago
- Type: Enterprise social software, Web 2.0
- License: Proprietary
- Website: www.hcltechsw.com/products/connections

HCL Connections is a Web 2.0 enterprise social software application developed originally by IBM and acquired by HCL Technologies in July 2019. Connections is an enterprise-collaboration platform which aims to helps teams work more efficiently. Connections is part of HCL collaboration suite which also includes Notes / Domino, Sametime, Portal and Connections.

== Overview ==
Connections was announced at Lotusphere 2007, and Version 1.0 shipped on June 27 that year.

| Version | Release date | Major release points |
|---|---|---|
| v1.0 | 29 June 2007 | First release. |
| v1.02 | 6 November 2007 | New plugins for Microsoft Windows Explorer, PowerPoint, Word, and Excel. |
| v2.0 | June 2008 | Widget based extensibility for Homepage, Profiles, and Communities. |
| v2.5 | 28 August 2009 | Added functionality: Wikis, Files, Microblogging, and social search / analytics. |
| v3.0 | 24 November 2010 | Added "wizards" for database creation and profile population, cluster functionality installed out of the box. |
| v3.0.1 | 5 April 2011 | Name change from IBM Lotus Connections to IBM Connections, Media library functionality, Ideation, Enterprise Content Manager (ECM) integration and advanced mobility possibilities. |
| v3.0.1.1 | 17 March 2012 | Forums content can be added by non-forum member. Forums question can be filtered on. |
| v3.0.1.1CR1 | 16 May 2012 | Bug fixes. |
| v4.0 | 15 September 2012 | Activity Stream, Embedded Experience, Integrated Mail and Calendar, Social Analytics, Mobility. |
| v4.5 | 12 March 2013 | Content Manager, @-mentions in mobile, two factor authentication in mobile, enhanced ideation, enhanced rich text editing, Microsoft Outlook Sidebar Plug-in, Activity Stream, Embedded Experience, Integrated Mail and Calendar, Social Analytics, Mobility. |
| v4.5. CR1 | 26 June 2013 | Bug fixes. |
| v4.5. CR3 | 30 November 2013 | Bug fixes. |
| v4.5. CR4 | 10 April 2014 | Bug fixes. |
| v5.0 | 26 June 2014 | File sync, ability to share content with external users from inside the firewall, smart expertise type ahead search, attention management indicators, updated user experience/look-n-feel, push notifications to mobile, redesigned mobile experience, activity stream search, enhanced file viewing and management, community landing, page, new Gallery app for Communities, wiki macros, @-mentions everywhere, copy/paste everywhere. |
| v5.5 | 18 December 2015 | New Verse-based theme, type ahead search, rich content app, nested folders, attachment search, improved editors. |
| v5.5 CR1 | 17 May 2016 | Bug fixes. |
| v5.5 CR2 | 10 November 2016 | Bug fixes. |
| v6.0 | 31 March 2017 | New Homepage (first "Pink" element), Communities modernized, Introduction of the Component Pack (containerized apps) |
| v6.5 | 12 February 2019 | First release from HCL |
| v7.0 | 12 April 2020 | Tailored Experience, Teams and Outlook integration, PDF Export |
| v8.0 | 2022 | Completely redesigned and unified user interface |

HCL Connections has the following components:

- Homepage – a portal site which can federate information from many sources.
- Microblogging – primarily used to stay current with updates from across the social network through the home page
- Profiles – a social network service – primarily used to find people in the organization by expertise, current projects, and responsibilities. Home page, microblogs, and tags.
- Communities – a collaborative space for people to work together with a discussion forum space.
- Ideation – Provides the ability to crowdsource ideas
- Media Gallery – Used to share photos and videos and stream those videos from the server
- Blogs – a blogging service.
- Bookmarks – a social bookmarking service.
- Activities – a task management tool for groups of people to work together on a specific project or task.
- Files – a content library for storing, sharing and revision management of computer files.
- Wikis – a Wiki system for publishing and editing content.
- Forums – an Internet forum system where people can ask questions, share their experiences, and discuss topics of common interest.
- Search – for searching across IBM Connections.

At Lotusphere 2010, IBM previewed features being planned for future releases, including:

- changes to how user-generated content is moderated
- compliance/auditing capabilities
- additional integration with IBM WebSphere Portal and Microsoft SharePoint
- expanded mobile support

HCL Connections uses open standards including ATOM and RSS to integrate with other applications, and provides a REST-like API for developers. Widgets can be added into HCL Connections, including those from Google Gadgets and other services as well as custom developed ones.

HCL Connections has been described as the leading product in enterprise social software market and IDC named it the worldwide leader in market share in 2011.

== Components ==
The ten HCL Connections components are built on a set of services according to the service-oriented architecture concept. These components take the form of J2EE applications which are hosted on IBM WebSphere Application Server. This design allows the components to be hosted independently of each other and to support very large scale deployments.

=== Homepage ===
The Homepage serves as a portal for user's social collaboration. Out of the box HCL Connections provides 20 widgets which can be customized by the user.

IT administrators can add new widgets and Open social gadgets for use by users.

The Homepage module also includes a 'recent updates' display which shows changes such as new content posts and status updates which are relevant to the user. A system to update the users status via microblogging is also provided.

=== Profiles ===
Profiles provides an online directory of people within an organization. People can be located by criteria such as keywords, names, responsibilities, interests, projects they are part of, expertise, business relationships, tags, or their location.

A person's profile typically contains their name, job role, base location, reporting chain and details about the IBM Connection bookmarks, activities, communities and blogs in which they participate. Profiles can be customized and new fields added.

=== Bookmarks ===
Bookmarks is a social bookmarking service which allows people to bookmark web-content, tag it, and share it. Bookmarks can be located via keyword, tags and the person who created the bookmark.

In addition to simple searching, Bookmarks can dynamically refine search results with the user identifying users or other tags of interest to them.

Bookmarks can output bookmarks via standard feeds and provides an API so that third-party tools can integrate with it. As of Connections 2.0.1, the API can be used for:

- Searching bookmarks
- Getting a list of bookmark tags
- Getting a list of popular bookmarks
- Adding bookmarks to a Web page
- Adding a list of bookmarks to a Web page
- Adding popular bookmarks to a Web page
- Creating bookmarks
- Deleting bookmarks
- Retrieving bookmarks
- Updating bookmarks

=== Activities ===
Activities is a task management system which enables groups of people to easily collaborate on a task. Activities are structured in a nested tree hierarchy where entries, to-do items and sections branch off from the root activity.

Any non-section entity in an activity can contain rich-text and custom fields for files, links, text, people and dates. To-Do items can also have a due date and a person the To-Do is assigned to.

=== Wikis ===
Wikis are a new capability added to IBM Connections 2.5 which facilitate the collaborative creation of web content. Wikis are collections of pages about a particular subject. Wiki members can edit or comment on the pages, or add their own pages. Teams can use wikis to create a central place to collaborate on a project.

=== Files ===
Files is a personal file-sharing service that is part of IBM Connections 2.5, used to upload, share, tag, recommend, and comment on files.

=== Communities ===
Communities enable ad hoc and planned collaboration around a project or area of interest. A Connections Community can have its own media gallery, event calendar, ideation, microblogging, blog, forums, bookmarks, activities, feeds, member list, Wiki and Files.

=== Blogs ===
Blogs provide blogging functionality for groups and individuals.

=== Forums ===
Forums is used for discussions. It was added as a component in 3.0, and was previously part of the Communities component.

== Plugins ==
HCL Connections integrates into existing applications via plug-ins. Out-of-the-box, the following plugins are available, most included as part of the license:

- HCL Notes
- HCL Sametime
- Microsoft Office including Word, PowerPoint, and Excel
- Microsoft Outlook
- Windows Explorer
- Microsoft SharePoint
- RIM BlackBerry
- Apple iPhone / iPad / iPod Touch
- Google Android Phones

Other integration with Microsoft SharePoint and Microsoft Office Communications Server has also been done.

ISVs have also integrated into the IBM Connections platform, such as Trilogy Group to add Social Project Management for complex projects, ISW & Bunchball to add a gamification layer, Blogs which serves as a native iPad blogging app for IBM Connections.
