= Rich client platform =

The rich client platform (RCP) is a programmer tool that makes it easier to integrate independent software components, where most of the data processing occurs on the client side.

== Overview ==
RCP is software consisting of the following components:

- A core (microkernel), lifecycle manager
- A standard bundling framework
- A portable widget toolkit
- File buffers, text handling, text editors
- A workbench (views, editors, perspectives, wizards)
- Data binding
- Update manager

With an RCP, programmers can build their own applications on existing computing platforms. Instead of having to write a complete application from scratch, they can benefit from proven and tested features of the framework provided by the platform. Building on a platform facilitates faster application development and integration, while the cross-platform burden is taken on by the platform developers. The platform allows the seamless integration of independent software modules like graphic tools, spreadsheets and mapping technologies into a software application with a simple click of the mouse.

Their creators claim that programs built with RCP are portable to many operating systems while being as rich as client–server applications which use traditional clients.

Open-source examples are the Eclipse, NetBeans and Spring Framework RCPs for Java.

== See also ==
- Application framework
- rich client
- Component-based software engineering
