= NeoOffice =

macOS office suite

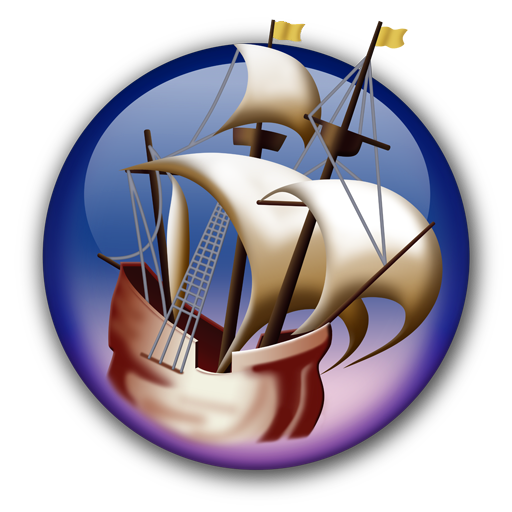

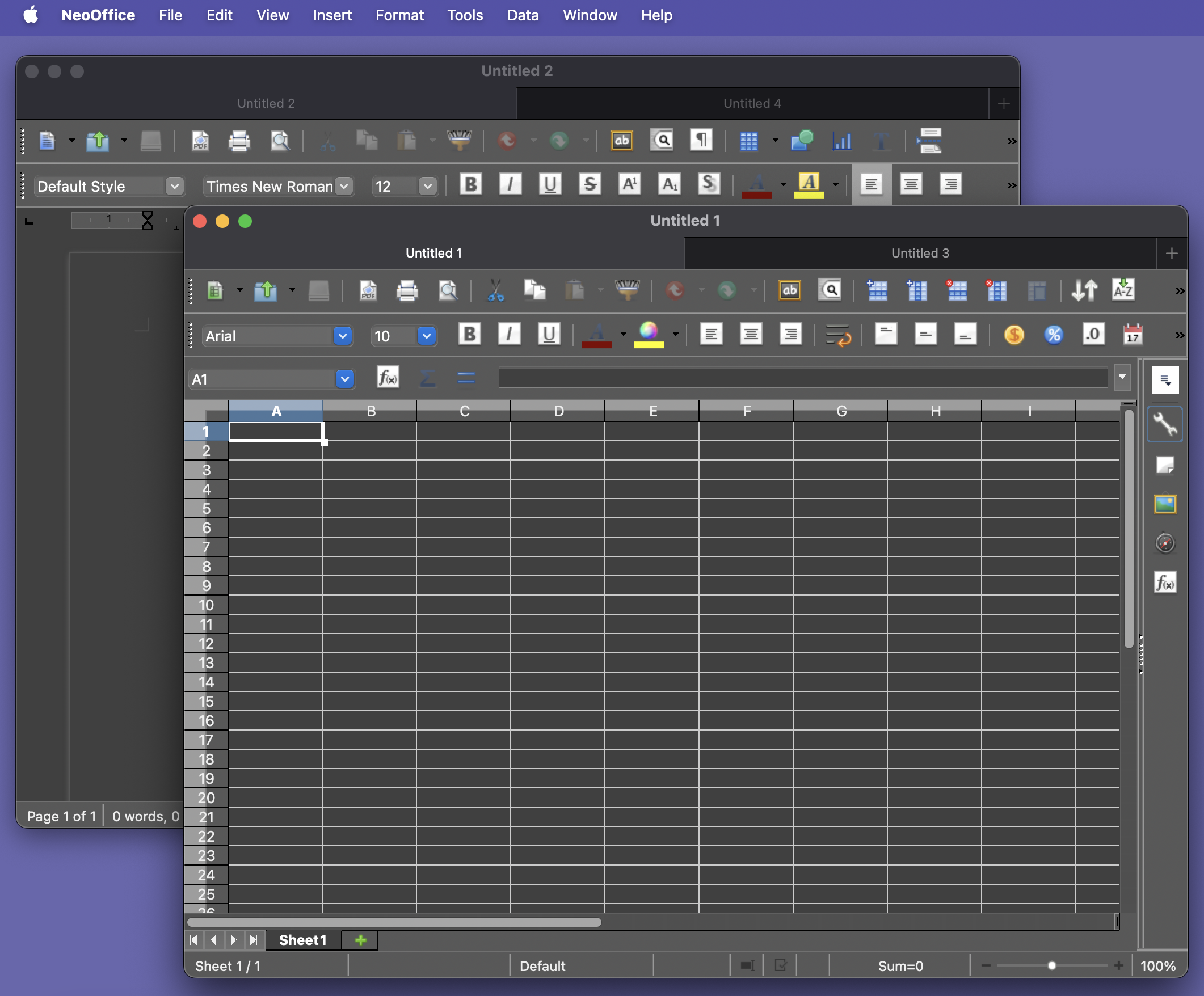
- Developer: Planamesa Inc.
- Final release: 2022.7 / 2 September 2023; 3 years ago
- Operating system: macOS 11+
- Successor: LibreOffice
- Type: Office suite
- License: MPL 2.0
- Website: neooffice.github.io
- Repository: github.com/neooffice/NeoOffice

NeoOffice is a discontinued office suite for the macOS operating system developed by Planamesa, Inc. It was a commercial fork of the free and open source LibreOffice office suite, including a word processor, spreadsheet, presentation program, and graphics program. It added some features not present in the macOS versions of LibreOffice and Apache OpenOffice. The last few versions were based on LibreOffice 4.4, which was released mid-2014.

The last version was 2022.7, released 2 September 2023. As of December 2023, NeoOffice is no longer active. The project recommends users move to LibreOffice, to which Patrick Luby of NeoOffice is a contributor.

== History ==
Versions of OpenOffice.org for Mac prior to 3.0 did not have a native Mac OS X interface; they required that either X11.app or XDarwin be installed.

NeoOffice was the first OpenOffice.org fork to offer a native Mac OS X experience, with easier installation, better integration into the Mac OS X interface (pull-down menus at the top of the screen and familiar keyboard shortcuts, for example), use of Mac OS X's fonts and printing services without additional configuration, and integration with the Mac OS X clipboard and drag-and-drop functions. Subsequently, both LibreOffice and Apache OpenOffice followed NeoOffice's lead and implemented similarly native Mac OS X interfaces.

NeoOffice began as a project to investigate methods of creating a native port of OpenOffice.org to Mac OS X. The project now called NeoOffice was originally dubbed "NeoOffice/J", reflecting its use of Mac OS X's Java integration to enable a native application. A related project was NeoOffice/C, which was a simultaneous effort to develop a version using Apple's Cocoa APIs. But NeoOffice/C proved very difficult to implement and the application was highly unstable, so the project was set aside in favor of the more promising NeoOffice/J. The "/J" suffix was dropped with version 1.2, since there was no longer another variety of NeoOffice from which to distinguish it. Many of these releases were preceded by a version that only Early Access Members could download; these versions were released about a month before the official release date.

All versions from NeoOffice 3.1.1 to NeoOffice 2015 were based on OpenOffice.org 3.1.1, though latter versions included stability fixes from LibreOffice and Apache OpenOffice. NeoOffice 2017 and later versions are fully based on LibreOffice.

In 2013, NeoOffice moved to a commercial distribution model via the Mac App Store. As of 2016, the source code is still available for free, but the software package was only available with the purchase of a commercial license. This has changed in 2022 as the code and all commits are released on GitHub. Moreover, the whole application is free of charge. Currently the NeoOffice website has the tag line, "An old fork of LibreOffice", and the notice: "The NeoOffice project is no longer active. As a replacement, you may want to try LibreOffice".

A timeline of major derivatives of: StarOffice and OpenOffice.org
NeoOffice

OOo version	Version	Release date	Release Notes
1.0.3.1	NeoOffice/C 0.0.1	June 22, 2003	Incendiary Goblin build
1.1.2	NeoOffice/J 1.1 Alpha 2	September, 2004	
1.1.3	NeoOffice/J 1.1 Beta	December, 2004	
1.1.4	NeoOffice/J 1.1 RC	March, 2005	
1.1.4	NeoOffice/J 1.1	June 22, 2005	
2.0	NeoOffice 1.2 Alpha	November, 2005	
2.0.1	NeoOffice 1.2 Beta	January 2, 2006	
2.0.1	NeoOffice 1.2	February 1, 2006	
2.0.2	NeoOffice 1.2.2	March 30, 2006	
2.0.2	NeoOffice 2.0 Alpha PowerPC	April 25, 2006	
2.0.2	NeoOffice 2.0 Alpha 2 PowerPC	May 9, 2006	
2.0.2	NeoOffice 2.0 Alpha 3 PowerPC	May 23, 2006	
2.0.2	NeoOffice 2.0 Alpha Intel	June 5, 2006	
2.0.2	NeoOffice 2.0 Alpha 2 Intel	June 19, 2006	
2.0.3	NeoOffice 2.0 Alpha 4	July 1, 2006	
2.0.3	NeoOffice 2.0 Aqua Beta	August 1, 2006	
2.0.3	NeoOffice 2.0 Aqua Beta 2	August 15, 2006	
2.0.3	NeoOffice 2.0 Aqua Beta 3	August 29, 2006	
2.1.0	NeoOffice 2.1	March 26, 2007	Introduced an icon set with designs that more closely resemble typical Mac OS X icons than those of OpenOffice.org.
2.2.1	NeoOffice 2.2.1	August 27, 2007	
2.2.1	NeoOffice 2.2.2	October 9, 2007	Bug fixes
2.2.1	NeoOffice 2.2.3	March 17, 2008	QuickTime video support, Menus available when no documents are open, Import images from scanners and cameras
2.2.1	NeoOffice 2.2.4	June 16, 2008	Media browser support, native floating tool windows, support for newer touchpad gestures, support for horizontal scrolling
2.2.1	NeoOffice 2.2.5	September 15, 2008	Bug fixes, speed improvements, apple remote support in Impress.
2.2.1	NeoOffice 2.2.6	October 27, 2009	Last version to support Mac OS X 10.3.
3.0.1	NeoOffice 3.0	March 31, 2009	Introduced access to the Mac OS X spellchecker, grammar checker, address book and media browser; users of languages not supported by the Mac OS X spellchecker can use the Hunspell system originally used. It also improved support for Microsoft Word 2007, Excel 2007 and PowerPoint 2007 documents, and for spreadsheets with Visual Basic for Applications macros that made their debut in version 2.1. Speed improvements, command clicking on window titlebar, Mac OS X 10.5 grammar checker. Requires Mac OS X 10.4 or above.
3.0.1	NeoOffice 3.0.1	October 27, 2009	
3.0.1	NeoOffice 3.0.2	February 1, 2010	Added native Mac OS X text highlighting, smoother text kerning and more
3.1.1	NeoOffice 3.1.1	May 10, 2010	Added support for "Look Up in Dictionary" context menu item in Writer to look up a word's definition, if it exists, in Mac OS X's Dictionary application. Also, users can view 10 versions of each NeoOffice Mobile file, The NeoOffice Mobile window is collapsible, and the NeoOffice Mobile menu uses less space in NeoOffice's menubar.
3.1.1	NeoOffice 3.1.2	September 7, 2010	Temporary files are encrypted when FileVault is enabled. Fix for bugs that cause embedded images to be lost after saving Writer or Impress documents.
3.1.1	NeoOffice 3.2	19 April 2011	Mac OS X 10.7 Lion support, more font support, smaller PDFs
3.1.1	NeoOffice 3.3	22 August 2012	High resolution text on Retina displays, OS X 10.8 Mountain Lion and Gatekeeper, Cocoa replaces Java
3.1.1	NeoOffice 3.4	22 October 2013	OS X 10.9 support, last version to support 10.6 & 10.7.
3.1.1	NeoOffice 2013	9 August 2013	First NeoOffice version available in Mac App Store, OS X 10.8 minimum required.
3.1.1	NeoOffice 2014	12 June 2014	64-bit and OS X 10.10 support
3.1.1	NeoOffice 2015	9 September 2015	OS X 10.11 support.
LibreOffice version	Version	Release date	Release Notes
4.4	NeoOffice 2017	17 August 2017	First version to be based on LibreOffice
4.4	NeoOffice 2022.1	25 June 2022	Universal installer, runs natively on Apple silicon Mac computers

== Supported file formats ==
Listed here, in the order of appearance in the Save As dialogue box, are the file formats supported for saving documents in NeoOffice 3.1.2. In cases where NeoOffice is used to edit a document originally in a Microsoft format, NeoOffice can save to that format without loss of formatting.

=== Word processor application ===
- OpenDocument Text (.odt) *
- OpenDocument Text Template (.ott)
- NeoOffice 1.0 Text Document (.sxw)
- NeoOffice 1.0 Text Document Template (.stw)
- Microsoft Word 97/2000/XP (.doc)
- Microsoft Word 95 (.doc)
- Microsoft Word 6.0 (.doc)
- Rich Text Format (.rtf)
- StarWriter 5.0 (.sdw)
- StarWriter 5.0 Template (.vor)
- StarWriter 4.0 (.sdw)
- StarWriter 4.0 Template (.vor)
- StarWriter 3.0 (.sdw)
- StarWriter 3.0 Template (.vor)
- Text (.txt)
- Text Encoded (.txt)
- HTML Document (NeoOffice Writer) (.html)
- AportisDoc (Palm) (.pdb)
- DocBook (.xml)
- Microsoft Word 2007 XML (.docx)
- Microsoft Word 2003 XML (.xml)
- OpenDocument Text (Flat XML) (.fodt)
- Pocket Word (.psw)
- Unified Office Format text (.uot)

=== Spreadsheet application ===
- OpenDocument Spreadsheet (.ods) *
- OpenDocument Spreadsheet Template (.ots)
- NeoOffice 1.0 Spreadsheet (.sxc)
- NeoOffice 1.0 Spreadsheet Template (.stc)
- Data Interchange Format (.dif)
- dBase (.dbf)
- Microsoft Excel 97/2000/XP (.xls)
- Microsoft Excel 97/2000/XP Template (.xlt)
- Microsoft Excel 95 (.xls)
- Microsoft Excel 95 Template (.xlt)
- Microsoft Excel 5.0 (.xls)
- Microsoft Excel 5.0 Template (.xlt)
- StarCalc 5.0 (.sdc)
- StarCalc 5.0 Template (.vor)
- StarCalc 4.0 (.sdc)
- StarCalc 4.0 Template (.vor)
- StarCalc 3.0 (.sdc)
- StarCalc 3.0 Template (.vor)
- SYLK (.slk)
- Text CSV (.csv)
- HTML Document (NeoOffice Calc) (.html)
- Microsoft Excel 2007 XML (.xlsx)
- Microsoft Excel 2003 XML (.xml)
- OpenDocument Spreadsheet (Flat XML) (.fods)
- Pocket Excel (.pxl)
- Unified Office Format spreadsheet (.uos)

=== Presentation application ===
- OpenDocument Presentation (.odp) *
- OpenDocument Presentation Template (.otp)
- NeoOffice 1.0 Presentation (.sxi)
- NeoOffice 1.0 Presentation Template (.sti)
- Microsoft PowerPoint 97/2000/XP (.ppt)
- Microsoft PowerPoint 97/2000/XP Template (.pot)
- NeoOffice 1.0 Drawing (NeoOffice Impress) (.sxd)
- StarDraw 5.0 (NeoOffice Impress) (.sda)
- StarDraw 5.0 (NeoOffice Impress) (.sdd)
- StarImpress 5.0 (.sdd)
- StarImpress 5.0 Template (.vor)
- StarImpress 4.0 (.sdd)
- StarImpress 4.0 Template (.vor)
- Microsoft PowerPoint 2007 XML (.pptx)
- OpenDocument Presentation (Flat XML) (.fodp)
- Unified Office Format presentation (.uop)
- OpenDocument Drawing (Impress) (.odg)

=== Graphics application ===
- OpenDocument Drawing (.odg) *
- OpenDocument Drawing Template (.otg)
- NeoOffice 1.0 Drawing (.sxd)
- NeoOffice 1.0 Drawing Template (.std)
- StarDraw 5.0 (.sda)
- StarDraw 5.0 Template (.vor)
- StarDraw 3.0 (.sdd)
- StarDraw 3.0 Template (.vor)
- OpenDocument Drawing (Flat XML) (.fodg)

=== Database application ===
- OpenDocument Database (.odb) *

=== Formula application ===
- OpenDocument Formula (.odf) *
- NeoOffice 1.0 Formula (.sxm)
- StarMath 5.0 (.smf)
- MathML 1.01 (mml)

(*Pre-chosen save default format.)
By default, NeoOffice loads and saves files in the OpenDocument file format, although this can be changed by the user. The OpenDocument file format is an XML file format standardized by OASIS (Organisation for the Advancement of Structured Information Standards).

== Licensing ==
Sun first released OpenOffice.org under both the LGPL and SISSL, later under only the LGPL, with a requirement for copyright assignment for any contributions to the main code base, which allowed Sun to create proprietary versions of the software (notably StarOffice). NeoOffice chose not to assign its code to Sun, which prevented Sun from using NeoOffice code in official OpenOffice.org versions.

There were initially some attempts to resolve the licensing differences and foster more direct cooperation and code-sharing between the NeoOffice and OpenOffice.org developers. However, the NeoOffice developers said that they preferred to work separately from OpenOffice.org because "coordination requires a significant amount of time." The OpenOffice.org developers said that "a proposal to work together has been made, and NeoOffice developers refused". The NeoOffice developers subsequently expressed support for LibreOffice and the launch of The Document Foundation.

== See also ==
- List of word processors
- Comparison of word processors
