= Sun Industry Standards Source License =

- Author: Sun Microsystems
- Latest version: 1.2
- SPDX identifier: SISSL, SISSL-1.2
- FSF approved: Yes
- OSI approved: Yes
- GPL compatible: No
- Copyleft: Weak

The Sun Industry Standards Source License (SISSL) is now a retired free and open source license, recognized as such by the Free Software Foundation and the Open Source Initiative (OSI). Under SISSL, developers could modify and distribute source code and derived binaries freely. Furthermore, developers could choose to keep their modifications private or make them public. However, the SISSL is unique among OSI-approved licenses in requiring that "The Modifications which You create must comply with all requirements set out by the Standards body in effect one hundred twenty (120) days before You ship the Contributor Version." If the Modifications do not comply, SISSL becomes a copyleft license, and source must be published "under the same terms as this license [SISSL] on a royalty-free basis within thirty (30) days."

Several open source projects funded by Sun Microsystems were licensed under SISSL, including OpenOffice.org, and Sun Grid Engine (SGE). Later versions of OpenOffice.org were dual-licensed under the SISSL and LGPL until the retirement of the SISSL, at which time OpenOffice.org was relicensed only under the LGPL. Sun Grid Engine appears to still be covered by the SISSL.

Sun's Chief Open Source Officer Simon Phipps announced the retirement of the license on September 2, 2005 to combat license proliferation. It is now listed by OSI as "voluntarily retired" by Sun, and the OSI license page states that "Sun has ceased to use or recommend this license." OpenOffice.org 2.0 code, for example, is now licensed exclusively under the LGPL. Sun developed the Common Development and Distribution License, a variant of the Mozilla Public License and later released OpenSolaris and the GlassFish Application Server under that license.

== Wikinews Sources ==
- Stephen Shankland (September 2, 2005), Sun retires one open-source license, CNET
- Statement on License Simplification (PDF) (PDF), OpenOffice.org, September 2, 2005
- License Simplification FAQ, OpenOffice.org, September 2, 2005
- Simon Phipps (September 2, 2005), Addressing Proliferation: Deeds not just Words, Sun Microsystems
