= Apache OpenOffice =

Free and open-source office software suite

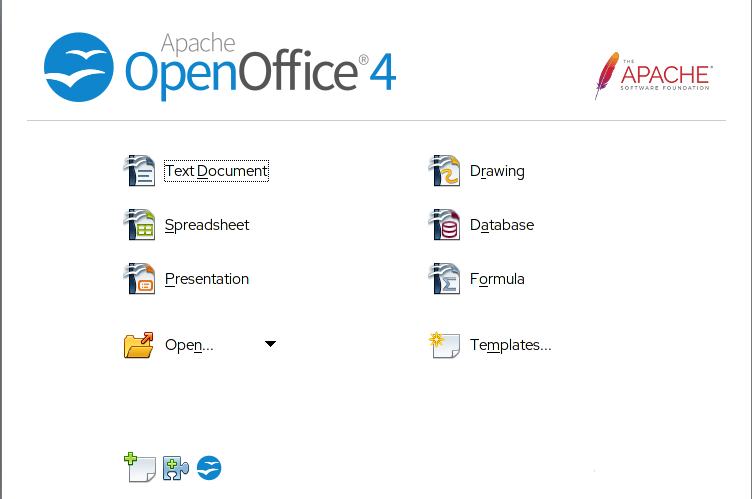
- Apache OpenOffice 4.1.11 Start Center
- Original author: Star Division
- Developer: Apache Software Foundation
- Release: 3.4.0 / 8 May 2012; 14 years ago
- Stable release: 4.1.17 / 14 October 2026
- Written in: C++ and Java
- Operating system: Linux, macOS, Windows
- Platform: IA-32 and x86-64
- Predecessor: OpenOffice.org
- Standard: OpenDocument
- Available in: 41 languages
- Type: Office productivity suite
- License: Apache-2.0
- Website: openoffice.org
- Repository: github.com/apache/openoffice

Apache OpenOffice is an open-source office productivity software suite developed by the Apache Software Foundation. It was created as a successor project of OpenOffice.org, itself a successor to StarOffice. It is also the designated successor of IBM Lotus Symphony. The suite includes applications for word processing (Writer), spreadsheets (Calc), presentations (Impress), vector graphics (Draw), database management (Base), and formula editing (Math). It supports the OpenDocument format and is compatible with other major formats, including those used by Microsoft Office.

Apache OpenOffice is developed for Linux, macOS and Windows, with ports to other operating systems. It is distributed under the Apache-2.0 license. The first release was version 3.4.0, on 8 May 2012. The most recent significant feature release was version 4.1, which was made available in 2014. The project has continued to release minor updates that fix bugs, update dictionaries and sometimes include feature enhancements. The most recent security release was 4.1.17 on 14 October 2026.

Difficulties maintaining a sufficient number of active developers and code contributors to keep the project viable have persisted for several years. This has led to persistent problems providing timely fixes to security vulnerabilities since 2015. In March 2026, the Apache Security Team raised OpenOffice's security risk status to "red" due to unfixed vulnerabilities over 365 days old.

== History ==
Sun Microsystems acquired StarOffice in 1999 and open-sourced the software in July 2000, renaming it OpenOffice.org, and releasing version 1.0 on 1 May 2002. Sun was acquired by Oracle Corporation in January 2010, which renamed the suite Oracle Open Office. In September 2010, the majority of outside OpenOffice.org developers left the project due to concerns over Sun's, and then Oracle's, management of the project, to form The Document Foundation (TDF). TDF released the fork LibreOffice in January 2011, which most Linux distributions soon moved to, including Oracle Linux in 2012.

In April 2011, Oracle stopped development of OpenOffice.org and laid off the remaining development team. Its reasons for doing so were not disclosed; some speculate that it was due to the loss of mindshare with much of the community moving to LibreOffice while others suggest it was a commercial decision. In June 2011 Oracle contributed the OpenOffice.org trademarks and source code to the Apache Software Foundation, which Apache re-licensed under the Apache License. IBM, to whom Oracle had contractual obligations concerning the code, appears to have preferred that OpenOffice.org be spun out to the Apache Software Foundation above other options or being abandoned by Oracle. Additionally, in March 2012, in the context of donating IBM Lotus Symphony to the Apache OpenOffice project, IBM expressed a preference for permissive licenses, such as the Apache license, over copyleft license. The developer pool for the Apache project was seeded by IBM employees, who, from project inception through to 2015, did the majority of the development.

The project was accepted to the Apache Incubator on 13 June 2011, the Oracle code drop was imported on 29 August 2011, Apache OpenOffice 3.4 was released 8 May 2012 and Apache OpenOffice graduated as a top-level Apache project on 18 October 2012.

IBM donated the Lotus Symphony codebase to the Apache Software Foundation in 2012, and Symphony was deprecated in favour of Apache OpenOffice. Many features and bug fixes, including a reworked sidebar, were merged. The IAccessible2 screen reader support from Symphony was ported and included in the AOO 4.1 release (April 2014), although its first appearance in an open source software release was as part of LibreOffice 4.2 in January 2014. IBM ceased official participation by the release of AOO 4.1.1.

Downloads of the software peaked in 2013 with an average of just under 148,000 per day, compared to about 50,000 in 2019 and 2020.

Difficulties maintaining a sufficient number of contributors to keep the project viable have persisted for several years. In January 2015, the project reported a lack of active developers and code contributions. There have been continual problems providing timely fixes to security vulnerabilities since 2015. In September 2016, OpenOffice's project management committee chair Dennis Hamilton began a discussion of possibly discontinuing the project, after the Apache board had put them on monthly reporting due to the project's ongoing problems handling security issues.

A timeline of major derivatives of: StarOffice and OpenOffice.org
Apache OpenOffice

== Naming ==
By December 2011, the project was being called Apache OpenOffice.org (Incubating); in 2012, the project chose the name Apache OpenOffice, a name used in the 3.4 press release.

== Features ==
=== Components ===
Module		Notes
AOO 4.0 Writer icon	Writer	A word processor analogous to Microsoft Word and WordPerfect.
AOO 4.0 Calc icon	Calc	A spreadsheet analogous to Microsoft Excel and Lotus 1-2-3.
AOO 4.0 Impress icon	Impress	A presentation program analogous to Microsoft PowerPoint and Apple Keynote. Can export presentations to Adobe Flash (SWF) files, allowing them to be played on any computer with a Flash player installed.
AOO 4.0 Draw icon	Draw	A vector graphics editor comparable in features to the drawing functions in Microsoft Office.
AOO 4.0 Math icon	Math	A tool for creating and editing mathematical formulae, analogous to Microsoft Equation Editor or MathType. Formulae can be embedded inside other Apache OpenOffice documents, such as those created by Writer. It supports multiple fonts.
AOO 4.0 Base icon	Base	A database management program analogous to Microsoft Access. Base can function as a front-end to a number of different database systems, including Access databases (JET), ODBC data sources and MySQL/PostgreSQL. Native to the suite is a version of HSQLDB.

=== Fonts ===
Apache OpenOffice includes OpenSymbol, DejaVu, Gentium, and the Apache-licensed ChromeOS fonts Arimo (sans serif), Tinos (serif) and Cousine (monospace).

=== OpenOffice Basic ===
Apache OpenOffice includes OpenOffice Basic, a programming language similar to Microsoft Visual Basic for Applications (VBA). Apache OpenOffice has some Microsoft VBA macro support. OpenOffice Basic is available in Writer, Calc, Draw, Impress and Base.

=== File formats ===
Apache OpenOffice obtains its handling of file formats from OpenOffice.org, excluding some which were supported only by copyleft libraries, such as WordPerfect support. There is no definitive list of what formats the program supports other than the program's behaviour. Notable claimed improvements in file format handling in 4.0 include improved interoperability with Microsoft's 2007 format Office Open XML (DOCX, XLSX, PPTX) — although it cannot write OOXML, only read it to some degree.

=== Use of Java ===
Apache OpenOffice does not bundle a Java virtual machine with the installer. The office suite requires Java for "full functionality" but is only required for specific functions. If you require Java for a function, you will see the message "OpenOffice requires a Java runtime environment (JRE) to perform this task".

== Supported operating systems ==
Apache OpenOffice 4.1.0 was released for x86 and x86-64 versions of Microsoft Windows XP or later, Linux (32-bit and 64-bit), and Mac OS X 10.4 "Tiger" or later.

Other operating systems are supported by community ports; completed ports for 3.4.1 included various other Linux platforms, FreeBSD, OS/2 and derivatives like ArcaOS, Solaris SPARC, and ports of 3.4.0 for Mac OS X v10.4–v10.5 PowerPC and Solaris x86.

== Development ==
Apache OpenOffice does not "release early, release often"; it eschews time-based release schedules, releasing only "when it is ready".

Apache OpenOffice has lost its initial developer participation. During March 2014 – March 2015 it had only sixteen developers; the top four (by changesets) were IBM employees, and IBM had ceased official participation by the release of 4.1.1.

In January 2015, the project reported that it was struggling to attract new volunteers because of a lack of mentoring and was badly in need of contributions from experienced developers. Industry analysts noted the project's inactivity, describing it as "all but stalled" and "dying" and noting its inability to maintain OpenOffice infrastructure or security. Red Hat developer Christian Schaller sent an open letter to the Apache Software Foundation in August 2015 asking them to direct Apache OpenOffice users towards LibreOffice "for the sake of open source and free software", which was widely covered and echoed by others.

The project produced two minor updates in 2017, although there was concern about the potential bugginess of the first of these releases. Patricia Shanahan, the release manager for the previous year's update, noted: "I don't like the idea of changes going out to millions of users having only been seriously examined by one programmer — even if I'm that programmer." Brett Porter, then Apache Software Foundation chairman, asked if the project should "discourage downloads". The next update, released in November 2018, included fixes for regressions introduced in previous releases.

The Register published an article in October 2018 entitled "Apache OpenOffice, the Schrodinger's app: No one knows if it's dead or alive, no one really wants to look inside", which found there were 141 code committers at the time of publication, compared to 140 in 2014; this was a change from the sustained growth experienced prior to 2014. The article concluded: "Reports of AOO's death appear to have been greatly exaggerated; the project just looks that way because it's moving slowly."

=== Security ===
Between October 2014 and July 2015 the project had no release manager. During this period, in April 2015, a known remote code execution security vulnerability in Apache OpenOffice 4.1.1 was announced (CVE-2015-1774), but the project did not have the developers available to release the software fix. Instead, the Apache project published a workaround for users, leaving the vulnerability in the download. Former PMC chair Andrea Pescetti volunteered as release manager in July 2015 and version 4.1.2 was released in October 2015.

It was revealed in October 2016 that 4.1.2 had been distributed with a known security hole (CVE-2016-1513) for nearly a year as the project did not have the development resources to fix it.

4.1.3 was known to have security issues since at least January 2017, but fixes to them were delayed by an absent release manager for 4.1.4. The Apache Software Foundation January 2017 Board minutes were edited after publication to remove mention of the security issue, which Jim Jagielski of the ASF board claimed would be fixed by May 2017. Fixes were finally released in October 2017. Further unfixed problems showed up in February 2019, with The Register unable to get a response from the developers, although the existing proof-of-concept exploit doesn't work with OpenOffice out-of-the-box.

Version 4.1.11 was released in October 2021 with a fix for a remote code execution security vulnerability (CVE-2021-33035) that was publicly revealed the previous month. The project had been notified in early May 2021. The security hole had been fixed in LibreOffice since 2014.

In October 2024, the Apache Software Foundation reported further problems, describing OpenOffice's security health status as "amber", with "three issues in OpenOffice over 365 days old and a number of other open issues not fully triaged." In July 2025, the Apache Security Team raised OpenOffice's risk status to "red", and in November 2025, OpenOffice 4.1.16 was released fixing a number of security issues, including one (CVE-2025-64401) which was already fixed in LibreOffice in May 2023. In March 2026, the Apache Security Team once again raised the risk status to "red", due to unfixed security issues in OpenOffice over a year old.

=== Releases ===
Oracle had improved Draw (adding SVG), Writer (adding ODF 1.2) and Calc in the OpenOffice.org 3.4 beta release (12 April 2011), though it cancelled the project only a few days later.

Apache OpenOffice 3.4 was released 8 May 2012. It differed from the thirteen-month-older OpenOffice.org 3.4 beta mainly in license-related details. Notably, the project removed both code and fonts which were under licenses unacceptable to Apache. Language support was considerably reduced, to 15 languages from 121 in OpenOffice.org 3.3. Java, required for the database application, was no longer bundled with the software. 3.4.1, released 23 August 2012, added five languages back, with a further eight added 30 January 2013.

Version 4.0 was released 23 July 2013. Features include merging the Symphony code drop, reimplementing the sidebar-style interface from Symphony, improved install, MS Office interoperability enhancements, and performance improvements. 4.0.1 added nine new languages.

Version 4.1 was released 29 April 2014. Various features lined up for 4.1 include comments on text ranges, IAccessible2, in-place editing of input fields, interactive cropping, importing pictures from files and other improvements. 4.1.1 was released 14 August 2014 and fixed critical issues in 4.1. 4.1.2 was released 28 October 2015 was a bug fix release, with improvements in packaging and removal of the HWP file format support associated with the vulnerability CVE-2015-1774. 4.1.3 was released 12 October 2016 and included updates to the existing language dictionaries, enhanced build tools for AOO developers, a bug fix for databases on macOS, and a security fix for vulnerability CVE-2016-1513. 4.1.4 was released 19 October 2017 as a maintenance release, fixing several bugs related to certain user options which would cause the application to crash. Version 4.1.5 was released 30 December 2017, containing bug fixes. Version 4.1.16 was released 10 November 2025 and was a security release, fixing vulnerabilities mostly related to remote documents.

== Distribution ==
Apache OpenOffice weekly downloads since 2012

As a result of harmful downloads being offered by scammers, the project strongly recommends all downloads be made via its official download page, which is managed off-site by SourceForge. SourceForge reported 30 million downloads for the Apache OpenOffice 3.4 series by January 2013, making it one of SourceForge's top downloads; the project claimed 50 million downloads of Apache OpenOffice 3.4.x as of 15 May 2013, slightly over one year after the release of 3.4.0 (8 May 2012), 85,083,221 downloads of all versions by 1 January 2014, 100 million by April 2014, 130 million by the end of 2014 and 200 million by November 2016.

As of May 2012 (the first million downloads), 87% of downloads via SourceForge were for Windows, 11% for Mac OS X and 2% for Linux; statistics for the first 50 million downloads remained consistent, at 88% Windows, 10% Mac OS X, and 2% Linux.

Apache OpenOffice is available in the FreeBSD ports tree.

== Derivatives ==
Derivatives include AndrOpen Office, a port for Android, and Office 700 for iOS, both ported by Akikazu Yoshikawa.

LibreOffice also used some changes from Apache OpenOffice. In 2013, 4.5% of new commits in LibreOffice 4.1 came from Apache contributors; in 2016, only 11 commits from Apache OpenOffice were merged into LibreOffice, representing 0.07% of LibreOffice's commits for the period. LibreOffice earlier rebased its LGPL-3.0-or-later codebase on the Apache OpenOffice 3.4 source code (though it used MPL-2.0, not the Apache-2.0) to allow wider (but still copyleft) licensing under MPL-2.0 and LGPL-3.0-or-later.

Older versions of NeoOffice included stability fixes from Apache OpenOffice, though NeoOffice 2017 and later versions are based on LibreOffice 4.4 which was released mid-2014.

== See also ==
- List of office suites
- Comparison of office suites
