= OpenOffice.org =

Office suite software

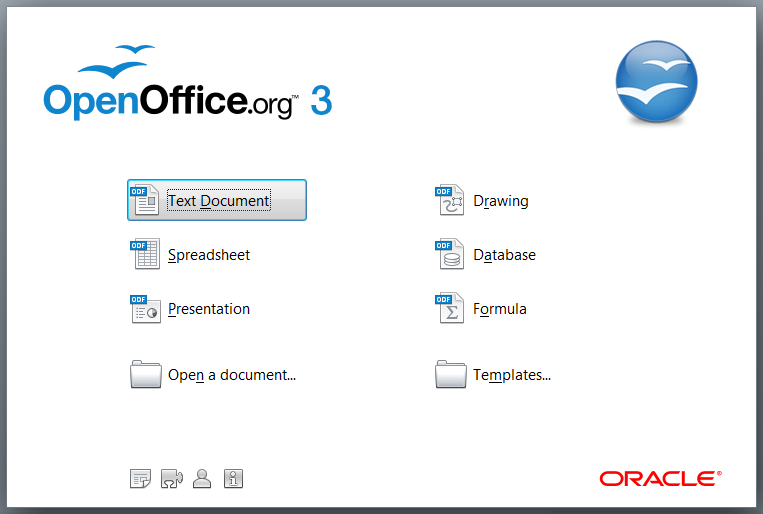
- The Start Center from OpenOffice.org v3.2.1
- Original author: Star Division (1985–1999)
- Developers: Sun Microsystems (1999–2009); Oracle Corporation (2010–2011)
- Release: 1 May 2002; 24 years ago
- Final release: 3.3.0 / 17 January 2011
- Written in: C++ and Java
- Operating system: Linux, Mac OS X, Microsoft Windows, Solaris
- Platform: IA-32, x86-64, Previously supported: PowerPC, SPARC
- Predecessor: StarOffice
- Successor: LibreOffice; Apache OpenOffice
- Standard: OpenDocument
- Available in: 121 languages
- Type: Office productivity suite
- License: Dual-licensed under the SISSL and GNU LGPL (OpenOffice.org 2 Beta 2 and earlier); GNU LGPL version 3 (OpenOffice.org 2 and later)
- Website: openoffice.org

OpenOffice.org is an open-source office productivity software suite. It originated from the proprietary StarOffice, developed by Star Division, which was acquired by Sun Microsystems in 1999. Sun open-sourced the software in July 2000 as a free alternative to Microsoft Office, and released OpenOffice.org version 1.0 on 1 May 2002.

Following Sun's acquisition by Oracle Corporation, development of OpenOffice.org slowed and eventually ended. In 2011, Oracle donated the project to the Apache Software Foundation, which continues it as Apache OpenOffice,, with the most-recent version being 4.1.16, released on November 10, 2025. A fork of OpenOffice, LibreOffice, was created in 2010 by members of the OpenOffice.org community.

OpenOffice includes applications for word processing (Writer), spreadsheets (Calc), presentations (Impress), vector graphics (Draw), database management (Base), and formula editing (Math). Its default file format is the OpenDocument Format (ODF), which it originated. It can also read a wide variety of other file formats, with particular attention to those from Microsoft Office. OpenOffice.org was primarily developed for Linux, Microsoft Windows and Solaris, and later for Mac OS X, with ports to other operating systems. It is distributed under the GNU Lesser General Public License version 3 (LGPL); early versions are also available under the Sun Industry Standards Source License (SISSL).

== History ==
OpenOffice.org originated from StarOffice, a proprietary office productivity software suite developed by German company Star Division beginning in 1985. In August 1999, Star Division was acquired by Sun Microsystems for US$59.5 million (equivalent to US$115 million in 2025), reportedly because the acquisition was less expensive than licensing Microsoft Office for Sun's 42,000 employees.

On 19 July 2000, at the O'Reilly Open Source Convention, Sun announced that it would release the StarOffice source code to encourage the development of a free and open-source office suite. The project, officially named OpenOffice.org, with the ".org" added to avoid trademark conflicts, officially released its source code on 13 October 2000. The first public preview, Milestone Build 638c, followed in October 2001 and quickly surpassed one million downloads. OpenOffice.org 1.0 was officially released on 1 May 2002.

OpenOffice.org became the default office suite on many Linux distributions and quickly emerged as a significant competitor to Microsoft Office, reportedly achieving 14% penetration in the large enterprise market by 2004. Sun designed the suite's OpenOffice.org XML file format, compressed in a ZIP archive, for easier data interchange and machine processing, intending it to replace proprietary binary formats. In 2002, Sun submitted the format to the Organization for the Advancement of Structured Information Standards leading to the creation of the OpenDocument file format standard in 2005, which was ratified as ISO/IEC 26300 in 2006. OpenDocument became OpenOffice's default format beginning with version 2.0 and other organizations would adopt the OpenDocument format.

Development of OpenOffice.org was led by Sun, which continued to use the codebase as the upstream source for StarOffice, which it continued to sell commercially. Sun also licensed the codebase to third parties, including IBM, which used it as the foundation for IBM Lotus Symphony (originally IBM Workplace). This dual role led to criticism that Sun prioritized commercial interests over community collaboration. For example, building OpenOffice.org on many Linux distributions proved difficult, prompting the creation of projects like ooo-build to improve compatibility and incorporate unaccepted community patches. Sun was also criticized for being slow to accept outside contributions and controversially required contributors to sign a Contributor Agreement granting joint ownership of submitted code, enabling the company to continue selling proprietary versions of the software.

Following Sun's acquisition by Oracle Corporation in January 2010, development continued under the new brand, Oracle Open Office. However, Oracle significantly reduced the number of developers assigned to the project, and its commitment to the project was widely questioned. In September 2010, the majority of community OpenOffice contributors left the project, and formed The Document Foundation (TDF), citing concerns over Oracle's management of the project and its broader approach to open-source software. TDF launched a fork called LibreOffice in January 2011, which was quickly adopted by most Linux distributions.

In April 2011, Oracle ceased development of OpenOffice and laid off the remaining team. While Oracle did not publicly state its reasons, speculation ranged from the project's declining community support to commercial considerations. In June 2011, Oracle donated the OpenOffice.org trademarks and codebase to the Apache Software Foundation. The code was relicensed under the Apache License at the request of IBM, with existing contractual interests in the code and preferred a permissive license. This donation became the foundation for the ongoing Apache OpenOffice project.

=== Governance ===
During Sun's sponsorship, the OpenOffice.org project was governed by the Community Council, comprising OpenOffice.org community members. The Community Council suggested project goals and coordinated with producers of derivatives on long-term development planning issues.

Both Sun and Oracle are claimed to have made decisions without consulting the Council or in contravention to the council's recommendations, leading to the majority of outside developers leaving for LibreOffice. Oracle demanded in October 2010 that all Council members involved with The Document Foundation step down, leaving the Community Council composed only of Oracle employees.

=== Naming ===
Although the project was commonly called OpenOffice, the official name was OpenOffice.org because "OpenOffice" was already a registered trademark in the Benelux region, owned by the company Open Office Automatisering since 1999. A similar trademark conflict in Brazil led to the suite being distributed there as BrOffice.org starting in 2004. The name was also adopted by a supporting nonprofit organization founded in 2006. The BrOffice.org nonprofit transitioned to supporting LibreOffice in December 2010.

== Features ==
OpenOffice.org 1.0 was launched under the following mission statement:

The mission of OpenOffice.org is to create, as a community, the leading international office suite that will run on all major platforms and provide access to all functionality and data through open-component based APIs and an XML-based file format.

=== Components ===
| Icon | Title | Description |
|---|---|---|
| OOo 3 Writer icon | Writer | A word processor analogous to Microsoft Word or WordPerfect. |
| OOo 3 Calc icon | Calc | A spreadsheet analogous to Microsoft Excel or Lotus 1-2-3. |
| OOo 3 Impress icon | Impress | A presentation program analogous to Microsoft PowerPoint or Apple Keynote. Impress could export presentations to Adobe Flash (SWF) files, allowing them to be played on any computer with a Flash player installed. Presentation templates were available on the OpenOffice.org website. |
| OOo 3 Draw icon | Draw | A vector graphics editor comparable in features to the drawing functions in Microsoft Office. |
| OOo 3 Math icon | Math | A tool for creating and editing mathematical formulas, analogous to Microsoft Equation Editor. Formulas could be embedded inside other OpenOffice.org documents, such as those created by Writer. |
| OOo 3 Base icon | Base | A database management program analogous to Microsoft Access. Base could function as a front-end to a number of different database systems, including Access databases (JET), ODBC data sources, MySQL and PostgreSQL. Base became part of the suite starting with version 2.0. HSQL was the included database engine. From version 2.3, Base offered report generation via Pentaho. |

The suite contained no personal information manager, email client or calendar application analogous to Microsoft Outlook, despite one having been present in StarOffice 5.2. Such functionality was frequently requested. The OpenOffice.org Groupware project, intended to replace Outlook and Microsoft Exchange Server, spun off in 2003 as OpenGroupware.org, which is now SOGo. The project considered bundling Mozilla Thunderbird and Mozilla Lightning for OpenOffice.org 3.0.

=== Supported operating systems ===
The latest version, 3.4 Beta 1, was available for IA-32 versions of Windows 2000 Service Pack 2 or later, Linux (IA-32 and x64), Solaris and Mac OS X 10.4 or later, and the SPARC version of Solaris.

The latest versions of OpenOffice.org on other operating systems were:

- IRIX (MIPS IV): v1.0.3
- Linux 2.2: v2.x
- Linux 2.4: v3.3.x
- Mac OS X v10.2: v1.1.2
- Mac OS X v10.3: v2.1
- Mac OS X v10.4-Mac OS X v10.6: v4.0
- Windows 95: v1.1.5
- Windows NT 4.0 SP6: v1.1.x
- Windows 98 and Windows ME: v2.4.3
- Windows 2000 Service Pack 2 or later: v3.3.x
- Solaris 7: 1.0.x
- Solaris 8, Solaris 9: v2.x
- Solaris 10: v3.4 Beta 1

=== Fonts ===
OpenOffice.org included OpenSymbol, DejaVu, the Liberation fonts (from 2.4) and the Gentium fonts (from 3.2). Versions up to 2.3 included the Bitstream Vera fonts. OpenOffice.org also used the default fonts of the running operating system.

Fontwork is a feature that allows users to create stylized text with special effects differing from ordinary text with the added features of gradient colour fills, shaping, letter height, and character spacing. It is similar to WordArt used by Microsoft Word. When OpenOffice.org saved documents in Microsoft Office file format, all Fontwork was converted into WordArt.

=== Extensions ===
From version 2.0.4, OpenOffice.org supported third-party extensions. As of April 2011, the OpenOffice Extension Repository listed more than 650 extensions. Another list was maintained by the Free Software Foundation.

=== OpenOffice Basic ===
OpenOffice.org included OpenOffice Basic, a programming language similar to Microsoft Visual Basic for Applications (VBA). OpenOffice Basic was available in Writer, Calc and Base. OpenOffice.org also had some Microsoft VBA macro support.

=== Connectivity ===
OpenOffice.org could interact with databases (local or remote) using ODBC (Open Database Connectivity), JDBC (Java Database Connectivity) or SDBC (StarOffice Database Connectivity).

== File formats ==
From Version 2.0 onward, OpenOffice.org used ISO/IEC 26300:2006 OpenDocument as its native format. Versions 2.0–2.3.0 default to the ODF 1.0 file format; versions 2.3.1–2.4.3 default to ODF 1.1; versions 3.0 onward default to ODF 1.2.

OpenOffice.org 1 used OpenOffice.org XML as its native format. This was contributed to OASIS and OpenDocument was developed from it.

OpenOffice.org also claimed support for the following formats:

| Format | Extension | Reading | Writing | Notes |
|---|---|---|---|---|
| OpenOffice.org XML | SXW, STW, SXC, STC, SXI, STI, SXD, STD, SXM | Yes | Yes | native up to 1.x |
| Microsoft Word for Windows 2 | DOC, DOT | Yes | Yes | |
| Microsoft Word 6.0/95 | DOC, DOT | Yes | Yes | |
| Microsoft Word 97–2003 | DOC, DOT | Yes | Yes | |
| Microsoft Word 2003 XML (WordprocessingML) | XML | Yes | Yes | |
| Microsoft Excel 4/5/95 | XLS, XLW, XLT | Yes | Yes | |
| Microsoft Excel 97–2003 | XLS, XLW, XLT | Yes | Yes | |
| DocBook | XML | Yes | Yes | since 1.1 |
| WordPerfect | WPD | Yes | | |
| WordPerfect Suite 2000/Office 1.0 | WPS | Yes | | |
| StarOffice StarWriter 3/4/5 | SDW, SGL, VOR | Yes | Yes | |
| Ichitaro 8/9/10/11 | JTD, JTT | Yes | | |
| ApportisDoc (Palm) | PDB | Yes | Yes | Requires Java |
| Hangul WP 97 | HWP | Yes | | |
| Microsoft Pocket Word | PSW | Yes | Yes | Requires Java |
| Microsoft Pocket Excel | PXL | Yes | Yes | Requires Java |
| Microsoft RTF | RTF | Yes | Yes | "you are likely to experience loss of formatting and images" |
| Plain text | TXT | Yes | Yes | various encodings supported |
| Portable Document Format | PDF | Yes | Yes | Export from 1.1; PDF/A-1a (ISO 19005-1) export from 2.4; some readable in Impress |
| Comma-separated values | CSV, TXT | Yes | Yes | |
| Microsoft Excel 2003 XML | XML | Yes | Yes | |
| Lotus 1-2-3 | WK1, WKS, 123 | Yes | | |
| Data Interchange Format | DIF | Yes | Yes | |
| StarOffice StarCalc 3/4/5 | SDC, VOR | Yes | Yes | |
| dBase | DBF | Yes | Yes | |
| SYLK | SLK | Yes | Yes | |
| HTML | HTML, HTM | Yes | Yes | |
| Quattro Pro 6.0 | WB2 | Yes | | |
| Microsoft PowerPoint 97–2003 | PPT, PPS, POT | Yes | Yes | |
| StarOffice StarDraw/StarImpress | SDA, SDD, SDP, VOR | Yes | Yes | |
| Computer Graphics Metafile | CGM | Yes | | Binary-encoded only; not those using clear-text or character based encoding |
| StarOffice StarMath | SXM | Yes | Yes | |
| MathML | MML | Yes | | |
| BMP file format | BMP | Yes | Yes | |
| JPEG | JPG, JPEG | Yes | Yes | |
| PCX | PCX | Yes | | |
| Photoshop | PSD | Yes | | |
| SGV | SGV | Yes | | |
| Windows Metafile | WMF | Yes | Yes | |
| AutoCAD DXF | DXF | Yes | | |
| MET | MET | Yes | Yes | |
| Netpbm format | PGM, PBM, PPM | Yes | Yes | |
| SunOS Raster | RAS | Yes | Yes | |
| SVM | SVM | Yes | Yes | |
| X BitMap | XBM | Yes | | |
| Enhanced Metafile | EMF | Yes | Yes | |
| HPGL plotting file | PLT | Yes | | |
| SDA | SDA | Yes | | |
| Truevision TGA (Targa) | TGA | Yes | | |
| X PixMap | XPM | Yes | Yes | |
| Encapsulated PostScript | EPS | Yes | Yes | |
| PCD | PCD | Yes | | |
| Portable Network Graphics | PNG | Yes | Yes | |
| SDD | SDD | Yes | | |
| Tag Image File Format | TIF, TIFF | Yes | Yes | |
| Graphics Interchange Format | GIF | Yes | Yes | |
| PCT | PCT | Yes | Yes | |
| SGF | SGF | Yes | | |
| Adobe Flash | SWF | Yes | | |

OpenOffice.org converted all external formats to and from an internal XML representation.

The OpenOffice.org API was based on a component technology known as Universal Network Objects (UNO). It consisted of a wide range of interfaces defined in a CORBA-like interface description language.

=== Native desktop integration ===
OpenOffice.org 1.0 was criticized for not having the look and feel of applications developed natively for the platforms on which it runs. Starting with version 2.0, OpenOffice.org used native widget toolkit, icons, and font-rendering libraries on GNOME, KDE and Windows.

The issue had been particularly pronounced on Mac OS X. Early versions of OpenOffice.org required the installation of X11.app or XDarwin (though the NeoOffice port supplied a native interface). Versions since 3.0 ran natively using Apple's Aqua GUI.

=== Use of Java ===
Although originally written in C++, OpenOffice.org became increasingly reliant on the Java Runtime Environment, even including a bundled JVM. OpenOffice.org was criticized by the Free Software Foundation for its increasing dependency on Java, which was not free software.

The issue came to the fore in May 2005, when Richard Stallman appeared to call for a fork of the application in a posting on the Free Software Foundation website. OpenOffice.org adopted a development guideline that future versions of OpenOffice.org would run on free implementations of Java and fixed the issues which previously prevented OpenOffice.org 2.0 from using free-software Java implementations.

On 13 November 2006, Sun committed to releasing Java under the GNU General Public License and had released a free software Java, OpenJDK, by May 2007.

=== Security ===
In 2006, Lt. Col. Eric Filiol of the Laboratoire de Virologie et de Cryptologie de l'ESAT demonstrated security weaknesses, in particular within macros. In 2006, Kaspersky Lab demonstrated a proof of concept virus, "Stardust", for OpenOffice.org. This showed OpenOffice.org viruses are possible, but there is no known virus "in the wild".

As of October 2011, Secunia reported no known unpatched security flaws for the software. A vulnerability in the inherited OpenOffice.org codebase was found and fixed in LibreOffice in October 2011 and Apache OpenOffice in May 2012.

== Version history ==
=== OpenOffice.org 1 ===
The source code for OpenOffice.org was released on 13 October 2000. The first public preview, known as milestone build 638c, was made available in October 2001. The first stable release, OpenOffice.org 1.0, was launched on 1 May 2002, under both the LGPL and SISSL licenses for Windows, Linux, and Solaris platforms. A Mac OS X version, using an X11 interface, was released on 23 June 2003. OpenOffice.org 1.0.3.1, released in April 2003, was the last version to officially support Windows 95.

The subsequent major release, OpenOffice.org 1.1, launched on 2 September 2003, introduced several new features, including one-click export to PDF, export to Flash (.SWF), macro recording, and a basic extension mechanism for third-party add-ons.

Version 1.1.1, released on 29 March 2004, was notable for being included in the OpenCD project, a curated collection of open-source software for Windows users.

On 2 September 2005, Sun announced it would retire the SISSL to help reduce license proliferation, though some analysts speculated the move was also intended to prevent IBM from reusing the code without contributing back. The 1.1.4 update, released on 22 December 2004, was the last version distributed under the dual SISSL and LGPL licenses. The change also applied to beta versions of OpenOffice.org 2, already under development.

The final release in the OpenOffice.org 1 series, version 1.1.5, arrived on 9 September 2005. It introduced the ability to edit documents in the OpenDocument format (ODF) and was the last version to officially support Windows NT 4.0.

=== OpenOffice.org 2 ===
Development of version 2.0 began in early 2003, guided by the "Q Product Concept", which aimed to improve Microsoft Office compatibility, performance, scripting support, GNOME integration, database usability, digital signatures, and overall user experience. It also marked the transition to ODF as the default file format. The first beta was released on 4 March 2005.

The final version 2.0 was released on 20 October 2005, followed by version 2.0.1 eight weeks later, which included bug fixes and new features. With version 2.0.3, the project switched from an 18-month release cycle to quarterly updates.

Version 2.1, released on 12 December 2006, included minor enhancements and bug fixes. This was followed by version 2.2 on 29 March 2007, which added further refinements, security updates, and small usability improvements. Version 2.3, released on 17 September 2007, introduced a redesigned charting component, enhanced the extension manager, and made several additional minor upgrades.

On 27 March 2008, version 2.4 was released with new features and bug fixes, incorporating enhancements from RedOffice, a Chinese derivative of OpenOffice.org. The final maintenance release in the OpenOffice.org 2 series, version 2.4.3, arrived on 4 September 2009 and was the last version to officially support Windows 98 and Windows ME.

Version 2 received significant media attention. PC Pro gave it a perfect 6-star rating, noting that it now rivaled Microsoft Office in features. Federal Computer Week listed it among the "5 stars of open-source products," citing the importance of the ODF standard. Computerworld reported that migrating to OpenOffice.org 2.0 cost some large government agencies just a tenth of the price of upgrading to Microsoft Office 2007.

=== OpenOffice.org 3 ===
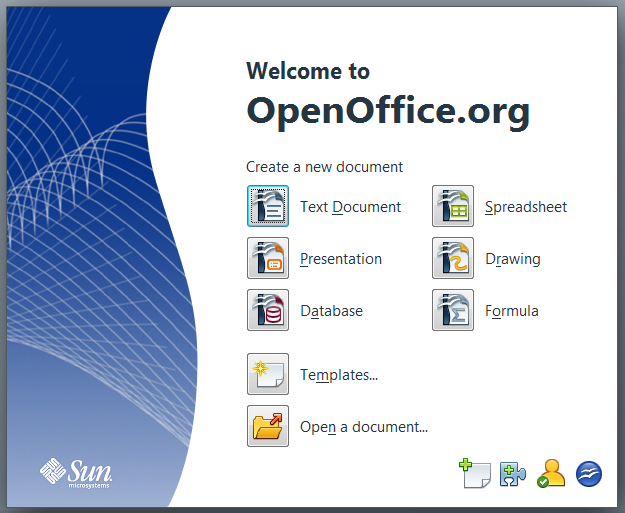
The Start Center for OpenOffice.org 3

Version 3.0 was released on 13 October 2008, introducing several major changes, including the ability to import (though not export) documents in Microsoft's Office Open XML format, compatibility with ODF 1.2, improved handling of Microsoft's Visual Basic for Applications macros, and a native Mac OS X interface. It also introduced the "Start Center" and adopted the LGPL version 3 license.

The 3.1 update, released on 7 May 2009, added support for overlining text and transparent dragging of objects.

Version 3.2, released on 11 February 2010, improved support for PostScript-based OpenType fonts, added integrity checks for ODF files with repair options, and reduced "cold start" times by 46% compared to version 3.0. This release also introduced new features and performance enhancements.

Version 3.2.1 followed on 4 June 2010,[1] featuring bug fixes, refreshed OpenDocument icons, and an updated "Oracle Start Center." It was the first stable release under Oracle's ownership.

The final Oracle-sponsored version, 3.3, was released on 26 January 2011. It added new spreadsheet functions and parameters, a revised print form, a FindBar, and usability improvements in Impress. Version 3.3 was also the last stable release to support Windows 2000 and Mac OS X on PowerPC systems.

Version 3.3, the last Oracle version, was released in January 2011. New features include an updated print form, a FindBar and interface improvements for Impress. In parallel, Oracle released a commercial variant Oracle Open Office 3.3 (formerly named StarOffice) on 15 December 2010, along with a proprietary cloud-based suite called Oracle Cloud Office, built on a separate codebase.

A beta of OpenOffice.org 3.4 was released on 12 April 2011, featuring SVG import, improved support for ODF 1.2, and enhanced spreadsheet functionality. However, before a final release could be issued, Oracle withdrew its support for the project, disbanding the remaining development team.

== Market share ==
Problems arise in estimating the market share of OpenOffice.org because it could be freely distributed via download sites (including mirror sites), peer-to-peer networks, CDs, Linux distributions and so forth. The project tried to capture key adoption data in a market-share analysis, listing known distribution totals, known deployments and conversions and analyst statements and surveys.

According to Valve, as of July 2010, 14.63% of Steam users had OpenOffice.org installed on their machines.

A market-share analysis conducted by a web analytics service in 2010, based on over 200,000 Internet users, showed a wide range of adoption in different countries: 0.2% in China, 9% in the US and the UK and over 20% in Poland, the Czech Republic, and Germany.

Although Microsoft Office retained 95% of the general market — as measured by revenue — as of August 2007, OpenOffice.org and StarOffice had secured 15–20% of the business market as of 2004 and a 2010 University of Colorado at Boulder study reported that OpenOffice.org had reached a point where it had an "irreversible" installed user base and that it would continue to grow.

The project claimed more than 98 million downloads as of September 2007 and 300 million total to the release of version 3.2 in February 2010. The project claimed over one hundred million downloads for the OpenOffice.org 3 series within a year of release.

=== Notable users ===
Large-scale users of OpenOffice.org included Singapore's Ministry of Defence, and Banco do Brasil. As of 2006 OpenOffice.org was the official office suite for the French Gendarmerie.

In India, several government organizations such as Employees' State Insurance, IIT Bombay, National Bank for Agriculture and Rural Development, the Supreme Court of India, ICICI Bank, and the Allahabad High Court, which use Linux, completely relied on OpenOffice.org for their administration.

In Japan, conversions from Microsoft Office to OpenOffice.org included many municipal offices: Sumoto, Hyōgo, in 2004, Ninomiya, Tochigi in 2006, Aizuwakamatsu, Fukushima, in 2008 (and to LibreOffice as of 2012), Shikokuchūō, Ehime, in 2009, Minoh, Osaka, in 2009 Toyokawa, Aichi, Fukagawa, Hokkaido, and Katano, Osaka, in 2010 and Ryūgasaki, Ibaraki, in 2011. Corporate conversions included Assist in 2007 (and to LibreOffice on Ubuntu in 2011), Sumitomo Electric Industries in 2008 (and to LibreOffice in 2012), Toho Co., Ltd. in 2009 and Shinsei Financial Co., Ltd. in 2010. Assist also provided support services for OpenOffice.org.

=== Retail ===
In July 2007, Everex, a division of First International Computer and the 9th-largest PC supplier in the U.S., began shipping systems preloaded with OpenOffice.org 2.2 into Wal-Mart, K-mart and Sam's Club outlets in North America.

== Forks and derivative software ==
A timeline of major derivatives of: StarOffice and OpenOffice.org

A number of open source and proprietary products derive at least some code from OpenOffice.org. Major derivatives include:

=== Active ===
==== Apache OpenOffice ====
In June 2011, Oracle donated the OpenOffice.org codebase and trademarks to The Apache Software Foundation. The resulting project, Apache OpenOffice project was expected to be developed by contributors from IBM, Linux distributors, and public sector agencies. In practice, most of the development was carried out by IBM, which had hired several former project developers from Oracle.

To comply with Apache's licensing policies, the project removed or replaced components from OpenOffice.org 3.4 beta 1 whose licenses were incompatible with the Apache License. The first Apache release, OpenOffice 3.4.0, was published in May 2012.

Later that year, IBM donated the codebase of Lotus Symphony, its customized version of OpenOffice.org, which was merged into Apache OpenOffice 4.0. Symphony was then discontinued. After IBM's withdrawal, the project has struggled to maintain a sustainable contributor base. Since 2015, Apache OpenOffice has faced ongoing difficulties delivering timely security patches. The most recent major feature release was version 4.1 in 2014, with the latest maintenance release, 4.1.16, issued on 10 November 2025.

In September 2016, discussions began about possibly retiring the project entirely, though no final decision was made. As of July 2025, Apache OpenOffice remains available for download, but the Apache Software Foundation acknowledges that the software contains multiple unresolved security vulnerabilities.

Although the Apache project considers itself the direct continuation of OpenOffice.org, others have described it as a fork or at least a separate project, due to its different governance model, licensing, and development direction.

==== LibreOffice ====
Sun had stated in the original OpenOffice.org announcement in 2000 that the project would be run by a neutral foundation, and put forward a more detailed proposal in 2001. There were many calls to put this into effect over the ensuing years. On 28 September 2010, in frustration at years of perceived neglect of the codebase and community by Sun and then Oracle, members of the OpenOffice.org community announced a non-profit called The Document Foundation and a fork of OpenOffice.org named LibreOffice. Go-oo improvements were merged, and that project was retired in favour of LibreOffice. The goal was to produce a vendor-independent office suite with ODF support and without any copyright assignment requirements.

Oracle was invited to become a member of the Document Foundation and was asked to donate the OpenOffice.org brand. Oracle instead demanded that all members of the OpenOffice.org Community Council involved with the Document Foundation step down, leaving the Council composed only of Oracle employees.

Most Linux distributions promptly replaced OpenOffice.org with LibreOffice; Oracle Linux 6 also features LibreOffice rather than OpenOffice.org or Apache OpenOffice. The project rapidly accumulated developers, development effort and added features, the majority of outside OpenOffice.org developers having moved to LibreOffice. In March 2015, an LWN.net development comparison of LibreOffice with Apache OpenOffice concluded that "LibreOffice has won the battle for developer participation".

Collabora Online is a version of LibreOffice with a web interface and real-time collaborative editing. It is developed by Collabora Productivity. Collabora Online also has local client applications for Android, Chromebooks, iOS, iPadOS, Linux, Mac and Windows.

=== Discontinued ===
==== NeoOffice ====
NeoOffice, an independent commercial port for Macintosh that tracked the main line of development, offered a native Mac OS X Aqua user interface before OpenOffice.org did. Later versions are derived from Go-oo, rather than directly from OpenOffice.org. All versions from NeoOffice 3.1.1 to NeoOffice 2015 were based on OpenOffice.org 3.1.1, though latter versions included stability fixes from LibreOffice and Apache OpenOffice. NeoOffice 2017 and later versions are fully based on LibreOffice.

==== Go-oo ====
The ooo-build patch set was started at Ximian in 2002, because Sun was slow to accept outside work on OpenOffice.org, even from corporate partners, and to make the build process easier on Linux. It tracked the main line of development and was not intended to constitute a fork. Most Linux distributions used, and worked together on, ooo-build.

Sun's contributions to OpenOffice.org had been declining for a number of years and some developers were unwilling to assign copyright in their work to Sun, particularly given the deal between Sun and IBM to license the code outside the LGPL. On 2 October 2007, Novell announced that ooo-build would be available as a software package called Go-oo, not merely a patch set. (The go-oo.org domain name had been in use by ooo-build as early as 2005.) Sun reacted negatively, with Simon Phipps of Sun terming it "a hostile and competitive fork". Many free software advocates worried that Go-oo was a Novell effort to incorporate Microsoft technologies, such as Office Open XML, that might be vulnerable to patent claims. However, the office suite branded "OpenOffice.org" in most Linux distributions, having previously been ooo-build, soon in fact became Go-oo.

Go-oo also encouraged outside contributions, with rules similar to those later adopted for LibreOffice. When LibreOffice forked, Go-oo was deprecated in favour of that project.

OpenOffice Novell edition was a supported version of Go-oo.

==== IBM Lotus Symphony ====
The Workplace Managed Client in IBM Workplace 2.6 (23 January 2006) incorporated code from OpenOffice.org 1.1.4, the last version under the SISSL. This code was broken out into a separate application as Lotus Symphony (30 May 2008), with a new interface based on Eclipse. Symphony 3.0 (21 October 2010) was rebased on OpenOffice.org 3.0, with the code licensed privately from Sun. IBM's changes were donated to the Apache Software Foundation in 2012, Symphony was deprecated in favour of Apache OpenOffice and its code was merged into Apache OpenOffice 4.0.

==== StarOffice ====
Sun used OpenOffice.org as a base for its commercial proprietary StarOffice application software, which was OpenOffice.org with some added proprietary components. Oracle bought Sun in January 2010 and quickly renamed StarOffice to Oracle Open Office. Oracle discontinued development in April 2011.
