= List of spreadsheet software =

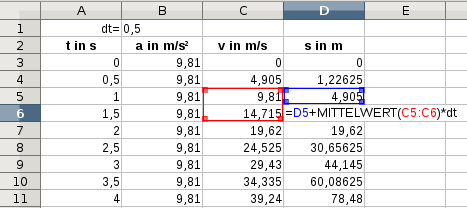
A spreadsheet calculation

The following is a list of spreadsheets.

== Free and open-source software ==
=== Cloud and on-line spreadsheets ===
| Title | Platform | Notes |
|---|---|---|
| Collabora Online Calc | Web application, Android, iOS, ChromeOS | Enterprise-ready LibreOffice. |
| LibreOffice Online Calc | Web application | |
| ONLYOFFICE | Web application | Community Server Edition |
| Sheetster | Web application | "Community Edition" is available under the AGPL |
| Simple Spreadsheet | Web application | |
| Tiki Wiki CMS Groupware | Web application | Includes a spreadsheet since 2004 and migrated to jQuery.sheet in 2010. |

=== Spreadsheets that are parts of suites ===
| Title | Platform | Notes |
|---|---|---|
| Apache OpenOffice Calc | Linux, macOS, Windows | Started as StarOffice, later as OpenOffice.org. It has not received a major update since 2014 and security fixes have not been prompt. |
| Collabora Online Calc | Android, ChromeOS, iOS, Linux, macOS, Online, Windows | Enterprise-ready LibreOffice, included with Online, Mobile and Desktop apps |
| Gnumeric | Linux, BSD | Started as the GNOME desktop spreadsheet. Reasonably lightweight but has very advanced features. |
| KSpread | Linux, Unix | Following the fork of the Calligra Suite from KOffice in mid-2010, superseded by KCells in KOffice and Sheets in the Calligra Suite. |
| LibreOffice Calc | Linux, macOS, Windows, BSD; Unofficial: Android, ChromeOS, iOS, Haiku | Developed by The Document Foundation. Started as StarOffice, then OpenOffice.org, and LibreOffice in mid-2010. |
| Siag | Linux, OpenBSD, Mac OS X | A simple old spreadsheet, part of Siag Office. |
| Sheets | Linux, FreeBSD, macOS, Windows, Haiku | Part of the Calligra Suite. |

=== Standalone spreadsheets ===
| Title | Platform | Notes |
|---|---|---|
| sc | Unix, Linux | Text-based spreadsheet calculator |
| GNU Oleo | Unix, Linux | Part of the GNU Project |
| Pyspread | Linux, macOS, Windows | Python-oriented spreadsheet |

== Proprietary software ==
=== Online spreadsheets ===
| Title | Platform | Notes |
|---|---|---|
| Airtable | Web application, iOS, Android, macOS, Windows | Spreadsheet-database hybrid |
| Coda | Web application, iOS, Android | |
| EditGrid | Web application | Discontinued since 2014; offered collaboration and API support |
| Google Sheets | Web application, Android, iOS, ChromeOS | Part of Google Workspace |
| iRows | Web application | Closed since 31 December 2006 |
| JotSpot Tracker | Web application | Acquired by Google Inc. |
| Smartsheet | Web application, iOS, Android | Project management and spreadsheet hybrid, integrated with Google Apps |
| ThinkFree Online Calc | Web application | Part of ThinkFree Office online office suite; built using Java |
| Zoho Sheet | Web application, iOS, Android | Cloud spreadsheet with real-time collaboration |

=== Spreadsheets that are parts of suites ===
| Title | Platform | Notes |
|---|---|---|
| Ability Office Spreadsheet | Windows | Part of Ability Office |
| Apple iWork Numbers | macOS, iOS, iPadOS, Web application | Included with Apple's iWork suite |
| AppleWorks | Windows, Mac OS | Development of historical ClarisWorks Office suite |
| WordPerfect Office Quattro Pro | Windows | Part of WordPerfect Office suite; historically one of the "big three" spreadsheets |
| EasyOffice EasySpreadsheet | Windows | Commercial suite focusing on user-friendliness |
| Framework | Windows | Historical office suite still available and supported |
| Google Sheets | Web application, Android, iOS, ChromeOS | Part of Google Workspace suite; supports offline and online editing |
| IBM Lotus Symphony | Linux, Mac OS X, Windows | Freeware suite |
| Kingsoft Office Spreadsheets 2012 | Windows | Handles .xls/.xlsx and exports to PDF; supports VBA macros |
| Lotus SmartSuite Lotus 123 | MS-DOS, Windows | Widely credited with driving early PC adoption in the 1980s and 1990s |
| Microsoft Office Excel | Windows, macOS, Android, iOS, Web application | Market leader |
| Microsoft Works Spreadsheet | MS-DOS, Mac OS, Windows | Single-sheet spreadsheet; discontinued |
| PlanMaker | Windows, Linux, Windows Mobile, CE, Android, iOS | Part of SoftMaker Office |
| Quattro Pro | DOS, Windows | Introduced as stand-alone, later part of WordPerfect Office in 1994 |
| StarOffice Calc | Cross-platform | Originally Star Division, acquired by Sun Microsystems; codebase became basis of OpenOffice.org |
| WPS Office Spreadsheets | Windows, Linux, macOS, Android, iOS | Part of WPS Office suite |

=== Stand alone spreadsheets ===
| Title | Platform | Notes |
|---|---|---|
| As-Easy-As | MS-DOS, Windows | By Trius, Inc.; unsupported; last versions available with free full license key |

=== Multi-dimensional spreadsheets ===
| Title | Platform | Notes |
|---|---|---|
| Javelin | MS-DOS | Early multi-dimensional modeling and reporting system |
| Lotus Improv | NeXTSTEP, Windows | Multi-dimensional dynamic modeling spreadsheet |
| Quantrix Financial Modeler | Windows, macOS | Modern multi-dimensional modeling engine based on Improv concepts |

=== Spreadsheets on different paradigms ===
| Title | Platform | Notes |
|---|---|---|
| DADiSP | Windows | Combines numerical capabilities of MATLAB with a spreadsheet-like interface |
| GeoGebra | Web application, Windows, macOS, Linux, Android, iOS | Dynamic mathematics software incorporating a spreadsheet view |
| Javelin | MS-DOS | Separated data, formulas, and views into individual models |
| Lotus Improv | NeXTSTEP, Windows | Separated data storage, formulas, and presentations into multidimensional categories |
| Resolver One | Windows | Business application representing spreadsheets as real-time executed IronPython programs |
| Spreadsheet 2000 | Mac OS, Windows | Visual dataflow-oriented spreadsheet (formerly Formulæ One) |

=== Spreadsheet-related developmental software ===
| Title | Platform | Notes |
|---|---|---|
| ExtenXLS | Cross-platform (Java) | Java Spreadsheet SDK and toolkit |

== Historical ==
In chronological order, year launched, product, launched for which machine/OS.

- 1979, VisiCalc for Apple II with 32K RAM, the first widely used normal spreadsheet with A1 notation etc.
- 1980, SuperCalc for CP/M-80 operating system, included with early Osborne computers.
- 1982, ZX81 Memocalc, for low cost ~$100 personal computer with 16K RAM expansion, launched by Memotech in April 1982.
- 1982, Multiplan for CP/M operating system, later becoming Microsoft Excel, launched Aug 1982.
- 1983, Lotus 1-2-3 for MS-DOS, the first killer application for the IBM PC, it took the market from Visicalc in the early 1980s.
- 1983, Dynacalc for OS-9 a Unix-like operating system, similar to VisiCalc.
- 1984, Lotus Symphony for MS-DOS, the follow-on to Lotus 1-2-3
- 1985, Boeing Calc for MVS and MS-DOS, written by subsidiary of aviation manufacturer Boeing.
- 1985, StarOffice for MS-DOS, later becoming OpenOffice.org then currently LibreOffice and Collabora Online.
- 1985, 20/20, for MS-DOS, competitor to 1-2-3 with database integration, real-time data updating, multiplatform.
- 1986, VP Planner for MS-DOS, similar in look and feel to Lotus 1-2-3, but included 5 level multi-dimensional database
- 1987, PlanPerfect for MS-DOS, distributed by WordPerfect Corporation.
- 1988, Wingz for Classic Mac OS operating system, a multi dimensional Spreadsheet from Informix.
- 1989, Quattro Pro for MS-DOS by Borland. The Windows version, introduced several years later was included in the PerfectOffice 3.0 suite.
- 1991, 3D-Calc for Atari ST operating system, multi-dimensional spreadsheet
- 1991, Lotus Improv for NeXTSTEP, a novel design that went beyond A1 notation.

== See also ==
- Comparison of spreadsheet software
- Comparison of software calculators
- Logical spreadsheet
