= Comparison of spreadsheet software =

Spreadsheet is a class of application software design to analyze tabular data called "worksheets". A collection of worksheets is called a "workbook". Online spreadsheets do not depend on a particular operating system but require a standards-compliant web browser instead. One of the incentives for the creation of online spreadsheets was offering worksheet sharing and public sharing or workbooks as part of their features which enables collaboration between multiple users. Some on-line spreadsheets provide remote data update, allowing data values to be extracted from other users' spreadsheets even though they may be inactive at the time.

== General ==
Name	Developer	Initial release	Platform	Latest release		License
Name	Developer	Initial release	Platform	Version	Date	License
Apache OpenOffice Calc	Apache Software Foundation	2012-05-08	Linux	4.1.16	2025-11-10	Apache-2.0
Apache OpenOffice Calc	Apache Software Foundation	2012-05-08	macOS	4.1.16	2025-11-10	Apache-2.0
Apache OpenOffice Calc	Apache Software Foundation	2012-05-08	Windows	4.1.16	2025-11-10	Apache-2.0
AppleWorks	Apple Inc.	1991	macOS	6.2.9	2004-01-14	Proprietary
AppleWorks	Apple Inc.	1991	Windows	6.2.2	2004-01-20	Proprietary
Calligra Sheets	KOffice KSpread Team		BSD	4.0.1	2024-09-02	LGPL
Calligra Sheets	KOffice KSpread Team		Linux	4.0.1	2024-09-02	LGPL
Calligra Sheets	KOffice KSpread Team		macOS	4.0.1	2024-09-02	LGPL
Calligra Sheets	KOffice KSpread Team		Windows	4.0.1	2024-09-02	LGPL
Collabora Online	Collabora	2019 (Note: The app uses LibreOffice kit technology and is based on Collabora Online for which development started in 2013.)	Android	26.04.3.1	2026-09-07	MPL-2.0
Collabora Online	Collabora	2021 (Note: Version 21.11. Using LibreOffice kit technology, development started in 2013.)	BSD	Build your own	Build your own	MPL-2.0
Collabora Online	Collabora	2019	ChromeOS	26.04.3.1	2026-09-07	MPL-2.0
Collabora Online	Collabora	2019	iOS	26.04.3	2026-09-08	MPL-2.0
Collabora Online	Collabora	2019	iPadOS	26.04.3	2026-09-08	MPL-2.0
Collabora Online	Collabora	2016 (Note: Version 1.0. Using LibreOffice kit technology, development started in 2013.)	Linux	Online server: 26.04.3.3	2026-09-14	MPL-2.0
Collabora Online	Collabora	2015 (Note: Version 4.4.)	Linux	Desktop app: 25.04.12	2026-08-31	MPL-2.0
Collabora Online	Collabora	2015	Linux	CODE: (Note: CODE: Collabora Online Development Edition) 26.04.3.3	2026-09-14	MPL-2.0
Collabora Online	Collabora	2015	macOS	25.04.12	2026-08-31	MPL-2.0
Collabora Online	Collabora	2015	Windows	25.04.12	2026-08-31	MPL-2.0
Google Sheets	Google	2006 (Note: Development started 2006.)	Android (Note: Offline editing when used with Chrome or Edge web browser.)	Rolling	Rolling	Proprietary
Google Sheets	Google	2006	ChromeOS (Note: Offline editing when used with Chrome web browser.)	Rolling	Rolling	Proprietary
Google Sheets	Google	2006	iOS	Rolling	Rolling	Proprietary
Google Sheets	Google	2006	Linux	Rolling	Rolling	Proprietary
Google Sheets	Google	2006	macOS	Rolling	Rolling	Proprietary
Google Sheets	Google	2006	Windows	Rolling	Rolling	Proprietary
GNU Oleo	Tom Lord	1992	Linux	1.6.16	1999-03-10	GPL-3.0-or-later
Gnumeric	GNOME community	1998 (Note: Development started 1998.)	BSD	1.12.62	2026-09-21	GPL-2.0-only or GPL-3.0-only
Gnumeric	GNOME community	1998	Linux	1.12.62	2026-09-21	GPL-2.0-only or GPL-3.0-only
Gnumeric	GNOME community	1998	macOS	1.12.62	2026-09-21	GPL-2.0-only or GPL-3.0-only
Gnumeric	GNOME community	1998	Windows (Note: Old versions.)	1.12.62	2026-09-21	GPL-2.0-only or GPL-3.0-only
Gobe Productive	Gobe Software	1998-08	BeOS	2.0.1	2000-02-29	Proprietary
Gobe Productive	Gobe Software	2001-12-12	Windows	3.04	2003-07-08	Proprietary
IBM Lotus Symphony	IBM	2008	Linux	3.0.1 FP2	2012-11-29	Proprietary
IBM Lotus Symphony	IBM	2008	macOS	3.0.1 FP2	2012-11-29	Proprietary
IBM Lotus Symphony	IBM	2008	Windows	3.0.1 FP2	2012-11-29	Proprietary
LibreOffice Calc	The Document Foundation	2011-01-25 (Note: Version 3.3. Development started 2010.)	BSD	26.2.3	2026-04-30	MPL-2.0
LibreOffice Calc	The Document Foundation	2011-01-25	Linux	26.2.3	2026-04-30	MPL-2.0
LibreOffice Calc	The Document Foundation	2011-01-25	macOS	26.2.3	2026-04-30	MPL-2.0
LibreOffice Calc	The Document Foundation	2011-01-25	Unix	26.2.3	2026-04-30	MPL-2.0
LibreOffice Calc	The Document Foundation	2011-01-25	Windows	26.2.3	2026-04-30	MPL-2.0
Microsoft Excel (Note: Started as Multiplan in 1982.)	Microsoft	2015-06-25	Android	16.0.15128.20206	2022-09-30	Proprietary
Microsoft Excel	Microsoft	2017-11	ChromeOS	?	Dropped 2021-09-18	Proprietary
Microsoft Excel	Microsoft	2013-06	iOS	2.66	2022-10-10	Proprietary
Microsoft Excel	Microsoft	2014-02	iPadOS	?	?	Proprietary
Microsoft Excel	Microsoft	1985	macOS	16.65	2022-09-13	Proprietary
Microsoft Excel	Microsoft	1989	OS/2	3.0	Dropped	Proprietary
Microsoft Excel	Microsoft	1987	Windows	2209	2022-09-26	Proprietary
Microsoft Works	Microsoft	1987-09-14	DOS	3.0b	1993	Proprietary
Microsoft Works	Microsoft	1988	macOS	4.0b	1994	Proprietary
Microsoft Works	Microsoft	1991	Windows	9	2007-09-28	Proprietary
Numbers	Apple, Inc.	2010-01-27	iOS	14.4	2025-04-03	Proprietary
Numbers	Apple, Inc.	2007-08-07	macOS	14.4	2025-04-03	Proprietary
OnlyOffice	Ascensio System SIA	2014 (Note: Development started 2009.)	Linux	9.4.0	2026-05-19	AGPL-3.0-only
OnlyOffice	Ascensio System SIA	2014	macOS	9.4.0	2026-05-19	AGPL-3.0-only
OnlyOffice	Ascensio System SIA	2014	Windows	9.4.0	2026-05-19	AGPL-3.0-only
OpenOffice.org Calc	Sun Microsystems (Note: 1999 – 2009.); Oracle Corporation (Note: 2010 – 2011)	2002-05	BSD	3.3.0	2011-01-17	Apache-2.0
OpenOffice.org Calc	Sun Microsystems; Oracle Corporation	2002-05	Linux	3.3.0	2011-01-17	Apache-2.0
OpenOffice.org Calc	Sun Microsystems; Oracle Corporation	2002-05	macOS	3.3.0	2011-01-17	Apache-2.0
OpenOffice.org Calc	Sun Microsystems; Oracle Corporation	2002-05	Solaris/Illumos	3.3.0	2011-01-17	Apache-2.0
OpenOffice.org Calc	Sun Microsystems; Oracle Corporation	2002-05	Unix	3.3.0	2011-01-17	Apache-2.0
OpenOffice.org Calc	Sun Microsystems; Oracle Corporation	2002-05	Windows	3.3.0	2011-01-17	Apache-2.0
PlanMaker	SoftMaker Software GmbH	1994	Android	2024	2023-06-20	Proprietary
PlanMaker	SoftMaker Software GmbH	1994	Linux	2024	2023-06-20	Proprietary
PlanMaker	SoftMaker Software GmbH	1994	macOS	2024	2023-06-20	Proprietary
PlanMaker	SoftMaker Software GmbH	1994	Windows	2024	2023-06-20	Proprietary
Pyspread	Martin Manns	2008 (Note: Development started 2008.)	BSD	2.4.5	2026-04-21	GPL-3.0-or-later
Pyspread	Martin Manns	2008	Linux	2.4.5	2026-04-21	GPL-3.0-or-later
Pyspread	Martin Manns	2008	Unix	2.4.5	2026-04-21	GPL-3.0-or-later
Pyspread	Martin Manns	2008	Windows	2.4.5	2026-04-21	GPL-3.0-or-later
Quattro Pro	Corel	1988 (Note: Development started 1988.)	Windows	2020	2020	Proprietary
sc	James Gosling et al	1981		7.16	2002-09-20	Public domain
Siag	Ulric Eriksson	(Note: Development started 1996.)	BSD	3.6.1	2006-11-10	GPL-2.0-or-later
Siag	Ulric Eriksson	(Note: Development started 1996.)	Linux	3.6.1	2006-11-10	GPL-2.0-or-later
Siag	Ulric Eriksson	(Note: Development started 1996.)	Unix	3.6.1	2006-11-10	GPL-2.0-or-later
Siag	Ulric Eriksson	(Note: Development started 1996.)	Windows	3.6.1	2006-11-10	GPL-2.0-or-later
StarOffice StarCalc	Sun Microsystems	1994	Linux	9.0U3	2009-09-09	Proprietary
StarOffice StarCalc	Sun Microsystems	1994	macOS	9.0U3	2009-09-09	Proprietary
StarOffice StarCalc	Sun Microsystems	1994	Windows	9.0U3	2009-09-09	Proprietary
WPS Office	Kingsoft	2012-03-23	Android	16.3.7	2022-07-22	Proprietary
WPS Office	Kingsoft	1988	DOS		Dropped	Proprietary
WPS Office	Kingsoft	2014	Linux	11.1.0.11664	2022-06-08	Proprietary
WPS Office	Kingsoft	2014	iOS	11.24.1	2022-07-14	Proprietary
WPS Office	Kingsoft	2019	macOS	4.2.1	2022-07-15	Proprietary
WPS Office	Kingsoft	1988	Windows	11.2.0.11191	2022-07-05	Proprietary
Name	Developer	Initial release	Platform	Latest release		License
Name	Developer	Initial release	Platform	Version	Date	License

== Operating system support ==
The operating systems the software can run on natively (without emulation). Android and iOS apps can be optimized for Chromebooks and iPads which run the operating systems ChromeOS and iPadOS respectively, the operating optimizations include things like multitasking capabilities, large and multi-display support, better keyboard and mouse support.

Name	Windows	macOS	Linux	BSD	Unix	Android	ChromeOS optimized	iOS	iPadOS optimized
Apache OpenOffice Calc	Yes	Yes	Yes	No	No	No	No	No	No
Calligra Sheets	Yes	Yes	Yes	Yes	No	No	No	No	No
Collabora Online Calc	Yes	Yes	Yes	Yes	Yes	Yes	Yes	Yes	Yes
Google Sheets	Yes	Yes	Yes	No	No	Yes	Yes	Yes	Yes
Gnumeric	Old versions	No	Yes	Yes	Yes	No	No	No	No
IBM Lotus Symphony	Yes	Yes	Yes	No	No	No	No	No	No
LibreOffice Calc	Yes	Yes	Yes	Yes	Yes	No	No	No	No
Microsoft Excel	Yes	Yes	No	No	No	Yes	Dropped 2021-09-18	Yes	Yes
Numbers	No	Yes	No	No	No	No	No	Yes	Yes
PlanMaker	Yes	Yes	Yes	No	No	Yes	?	No	No
Pyspread	Yes	Unsupported	Yes	Yes	Yes	No	No	No	No
Quattro Pro	Yes	No	No	No	No	No	No	No	No
Siag	No	Yes	Yes	Yes	Yes	No	No	No	No
WPS Office	Yes	Yes	Yes	No	No	Yes	?	Yes	?

== Supported file formats ==
This table gives a comparison of what file formats each spreadsheet can import and export. "Yes" means can both import and export.

Name	CSV	Excel (xls)	HTML	LaTeX	ODF (ods)	OOXML (xlsx)	PDF	DIF	OpenOffice.org XML (sxc)
Apache OpenOffice Calc	Yes	Yes	Yes	Export	Yes	Import	Export	Yes	Yes
Calligra Sheets	Yes	Import	Export	Export	Yes	No	Export	?	Yes
Collabora Online Calc - online and mobile	Yes	Yes	Export	No	Yes	Yes	Export	No	No
Collabora Online Calc - desktop	Yes	Yes	Export	Export	Yes	Yes	Export	Yes	Yes
Google Sheets	Import	Import	No	No	Yes	Yes	Export	No	No
Gnumeric	Yes	Yes	Yes	Export	Yes	Yes	Export	Import	Import
IBM Lotus Symphony	Yes	Yes	Export	No	Yes	Import	Export		Yes
LibreOffice Calc	Yes	Yes	Yes	Export	Yes	Yes	Export	Yes	Yes
Microsoft Excel	Yes	Yes	Partial	No	Yes	Yes	Export	Yes	No
WPS Office	Yes	Yes	Partial	No	Yes	Yes	Export	Import	No
Numbers	Yes	Yes	No	No	Import	Import	Export		No
Quattro Pro	Yes	Yes	Yes	No	No	Yes	Export		No
PlanMaker	Yes	Yes	Export	No	No	Yes	Export		No
Pyspread	Yes	No	Import	No	No	Import	Export	No	No
Siag	Yes	Import partial	Yes	Export	No	No	Export		Import partial

== Rows and Columns ==
Program	Rows (per sheet)	Columns (per sheet)	Total cells (per sheet)	Sheets	Total cells (per workbook)
Collabora Online 22.05, or later versions – Online, Desktop, Tablet, Mobile	1,048,576	16,384	17,179,869,184	1,024	17,592,186,044,400
Gnumeric	16,777,216	16,384	274,877,906,944	142,648	603,103
Google Sheets	1,048,576	18,278	10,000,000	200	10,000,000
KSpread	32,767	32,767	1,073,676,289	130,645	953,923
LibreOffice Calc 5.4.5 – 7.3	1,048,576	1,024	1,073,741,824	1,024	1,099,511,627,776
LibreOffice Calc 7.4, or later versions	1,048,576	16,384	17,179,869,184	10,000	17,592,186,044,400
Lotus 1-2-3	65,536	256	16,777,216	256	4,294,967,296
Microsoft Excel 2003	65,536	256	16,777,216	65,531	1,099,427,741,696
Microsoft Excel 2007, or later versions	1,048,576	16,384	17,179,869,184	Limited by available memory	Limited by available memory
OpenOffice.org Calc 2	65,536	256	16,777,216	256	4,294,967,296
OpenOffice.org Calc 3.0, 3.1 and 3.2	65,536	1024	67,108,864	256	17,179,869,184
OpenOffice.org Calc 3.3	1,048,576	1024	1,073,741,824	256	274,877,906,944
Pyspread	~80 000 000 (limited by sum of row heights)	~30 000 000 (limited by sum of column widths)	Limited by available memory	Limited by available memory	Limited by available memory

-* 32-bit addressable memory on Microsoft Windows, i.e. ~2.5 GB.

== See also ==
- List of spreadsheet software
- Comparison of word processors
- Comparison of office suites
