= LibreOffice Calc =

Spreadsheet component of LibreOffice

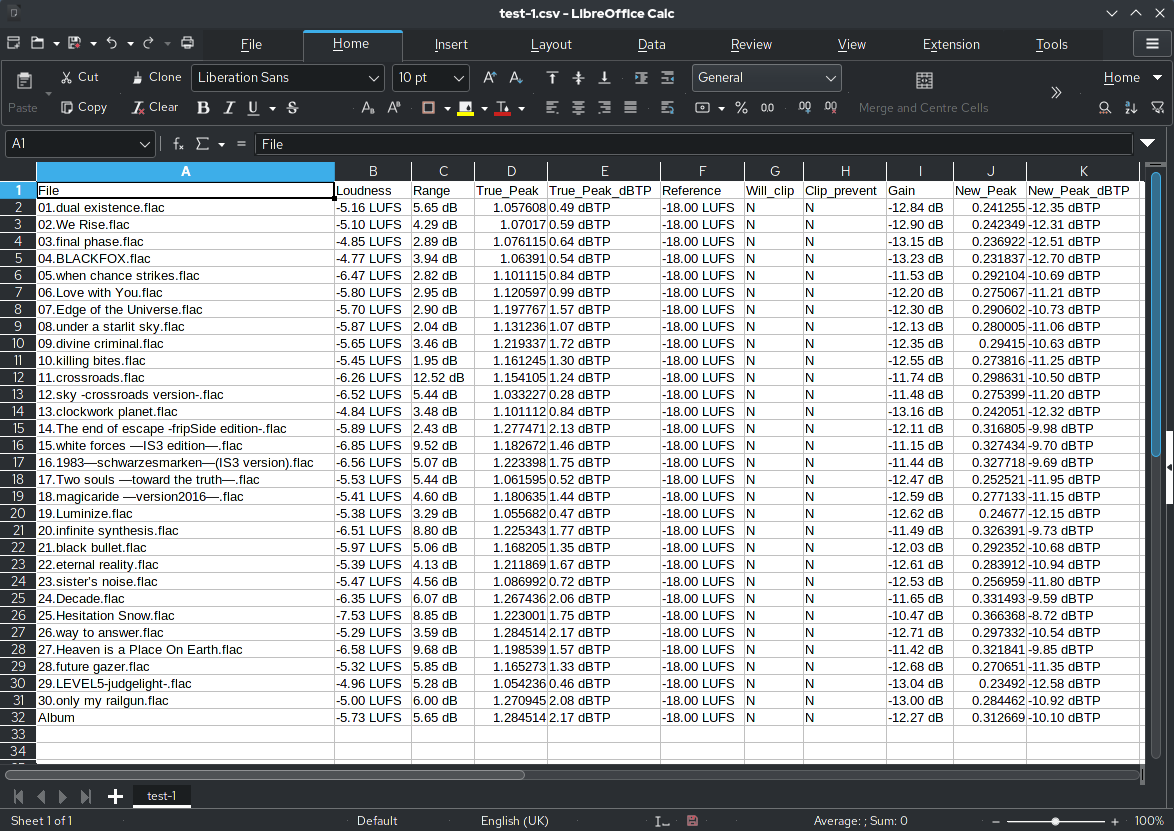
- LibreOffice Calc 7.2.4 (released in December 2021, running on Linux and KDE Plasma 5 with the Breeze icon set)
- Developer: The Document Foundation

Stable release(s)
- Fresh: 25.8.4 / 18 December 2025; Still: 25.2.7 / 30 October 2025
- Repository: git.libreoffice.org/core
- Operating system: Cross platform
- Type: Spreadsheet
- License: MPLv2.0 (secondary license GPL, LGPLv3+ or Apache License 2.0)
- Website: libreoffice.org/discover/calc

LibreOffice Calc is the spreadsheet component of the LibreOffice suite.

After forking from OpenOffice.org in 2010, LibreOffice Calc underwent a massive re-work of external reference handling to fix many defects in formula calculations involving external references, and to boost data caching performance, especially when referencing large data ranges.

Calc is capable of opening and saving most spreadsheets in Microsoft Excel file format. Calc is also capable of saving spreadsheets as PDF files.

As with the entire LibreOffice suite, Calc is available for a variety of platforms, including Linux, macOS, Microsoft Windows, and FreeBSD. Available under the Mozilla Public License, Calc is free and open-source software. There are community builds for many other platforms. Ecosystem partner Collabora uses LibreOffice upstream code and provides apps for Android, iOS, iPadOS and ChromeOS. LibreOffice Online is an online office suite which includes the applications Writer, Calc and Impress and provides an upstream for projects such as commercial Collabora Online.

There is now a closed beta of LibreOffice on AmigaOS 4.1.

== Features ==
Capabilities of Calc include:

- Ability to read/write OpenDocument (ODF), Microsoft Excel (XLSX), CSV, and several other formats.
- Support for many functions, including those for imaginary numbers, as well as financial and statistical functions.
- Supports 1,048,576 rows and 16384 columns in a spreadsheet, making LibreOffice spreadsheets more suitable for heavier scientific or financial spreadsheets. Version 7.0 introduced "very large spreadsheets" which can be enabled as an experimental feature. Version 7.4 made very large spreadsheets default.
- Up to now, new functions such as IFS, Switch TEXT JOIN, MAXIFS, MINIFS functions, etc. were available only in Excel 2016 and later. LibreOffice Calc can use them.

=== Pivot Table ===
Originally called DataPilot, Pivot Table provides similar functionality to the Pivot table found in Microsoft Excel. It is used for interactive table layout and dynamic data analysis.

An advanced sort macro is included that allows data to be arranged or categorised based on either a user generated macro or one of several default included macros.

== Supported file formats ==
File format	Extension	Read/Write	Notes
Apple Numbers	NUMBERS	From 5.0	
Comma-separated values	CSV	Yes	
Data Interchange Format	DIF	Yes	
DBase, Clipper, VP-Info, FoxPro	DBF	Yes	
Gnumeric	GNM, GNUMERIC	From 5.1, cannot write	
Lotus 1-2-3	123, WKS, WKS1, WK2, WK3, WK4	Yes	
Microsoft Excel 4/5/95	XLS, XLW, XLT	Yes, writing up to 3.6	
Microsoft Excel 97–2003	XLS, XLW, XLT	Yes	
Microsoft Excel 2007–2021	XLSX, XLTX, XLSM, XLTM	Yes	
Microsoft Excel 2003 XML	XML	Yes	
Microsoft Excel Web Query File	IQY	From 5.4	
Microsoft Pocket Excel	PXL	Yes	Requires Java
OpenDocument (spreadsheet)	ODS, FODS, OTS,	Yes	
OpenOffice.org XML (spreadsheet)	SXC, STC	Yes	
Quattro Pro 6.0	WB2, WQ1, WQ2	Yes	
StarOffice StarCalc 3/4/5	SDC, VOR	Dropped in 4.0 then added back in 5.3, write up to 3.6	
SYLK	SLK	Yes	

== See also ==
- LibreOffice Writer
- List of spreadsheet software
- Comparison of spreadsheet software
