= Calligra Sheets =

Calculation and spreadsheet application for KDE desktop environment

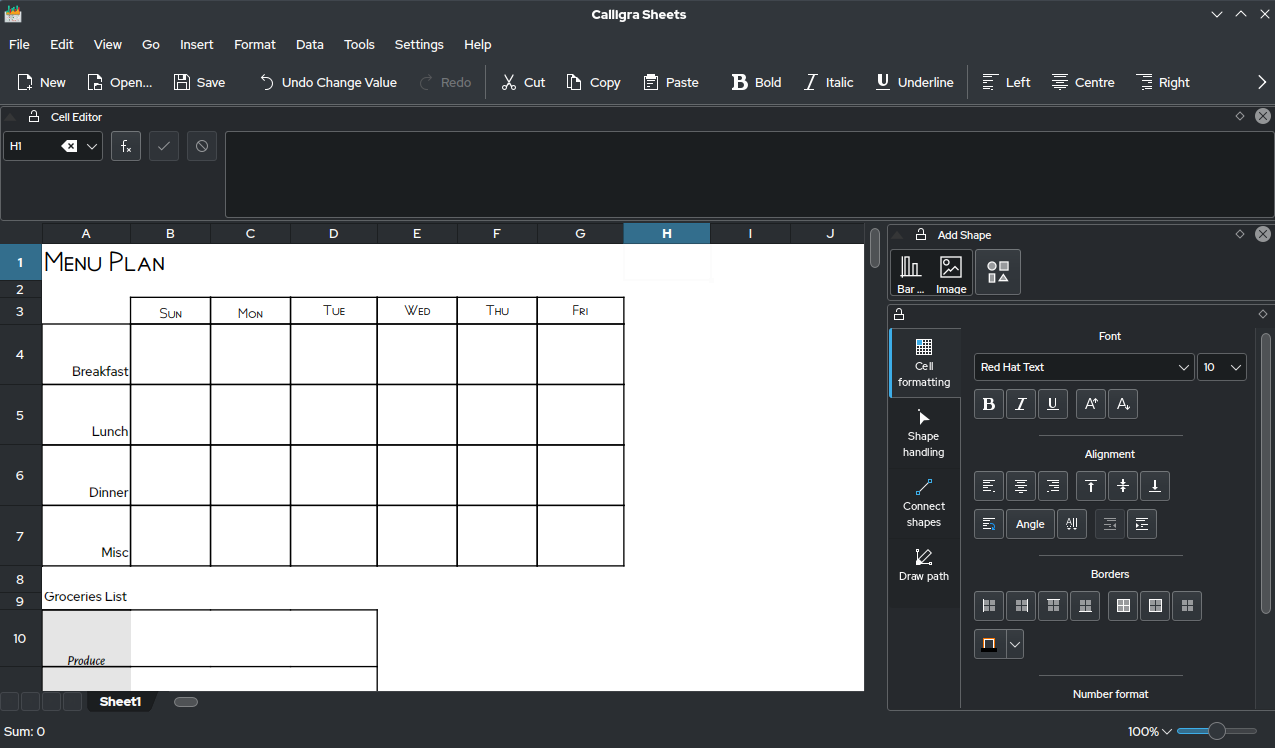
- Calligra Sheets 3.2.1 screenshot
- Developer: KDE
- Operating system: Unix-like, Windows
- Type: Spreadsheet
- License: LGPL
- Website: calligra.org/sheets/

Calligra Sheets (formerly KSpread and Calligra Tables) is a free software spreadsheet application that is part of Calligra Suite, an integrated graphic art and office suite developed by KDE.

== Features ==
Among Sheets’ features are multiple sheets per document, assorted formatting possibilities, support for more than 300 built-in functions, templates, chart, spell-check, hyperlinks, data sorting and scripting with Python, Ruby and JavaScript.

== Formats ==
Sheets’ native file format has been OpenDocument since version two and previously used its own XML format, compressed with ZIP. Sheets also has the ability to import several spreadsheet formats, including XLS (Microsoft Excel), Applix Spreadsheet, Quattro Pro, CSV, dBase, Gnumeric, SXC (OpenOffice.org XML), Kexi and TXT. It supports export of OpenDocument Spreadsheet, SXC, Tables document, CSV, HTML, Gnumeric, TeX and TXT. Sheets does not support export of XLS.

== KChart ==
KChart is the charting tool of Calligra Suite. The plug-in is relatively simple compared to other office applications such as OpenOffice, being designed for small datasets, and using only the most common 5–6 types of chart (histograms, pie charts, line charts, etc.)

== See also ==
- Comparison of spreadsheet software
