= Spreadsheet =

Computer program for working with tabular data

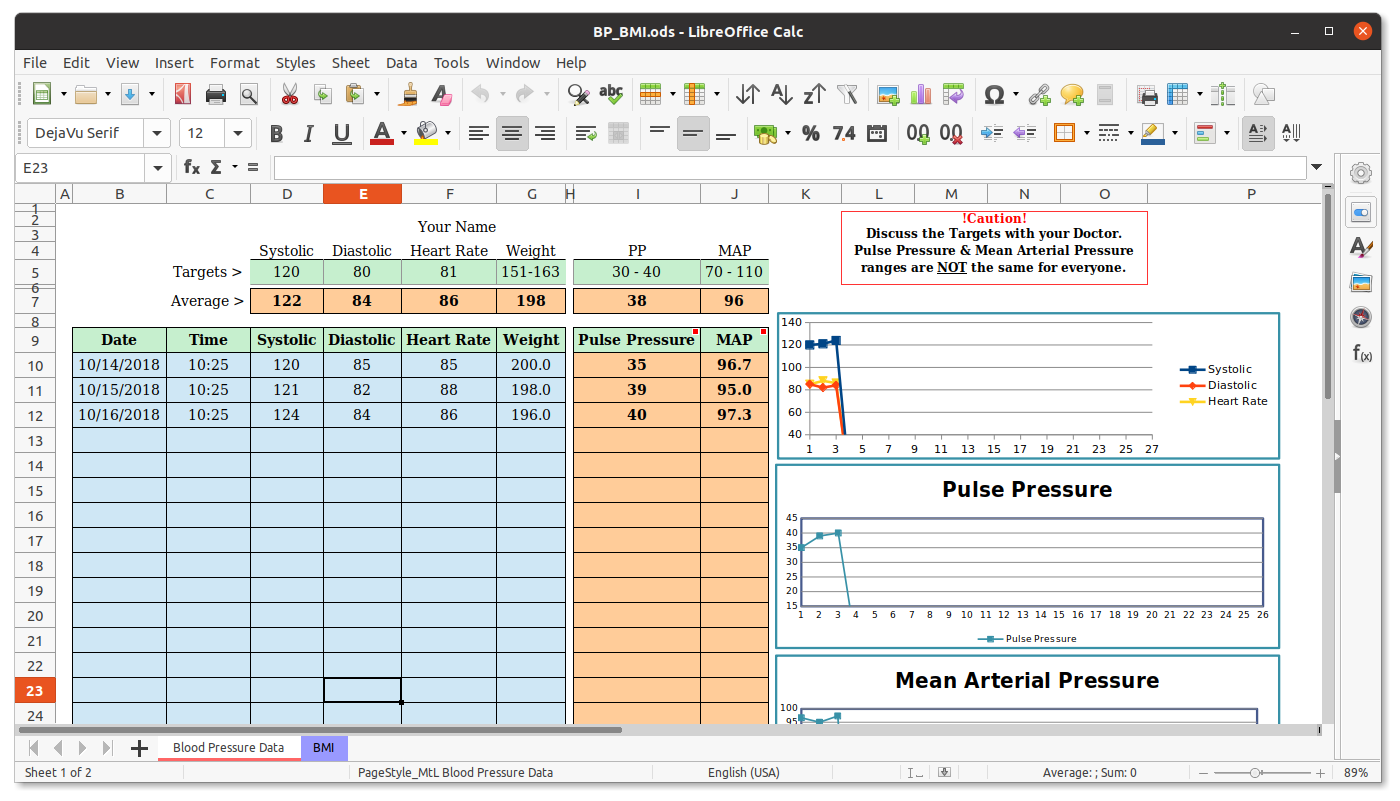
A spreadsheet being edited in LibreOffice Calc, showing a table of data, graphs with data from the tables, and formatted cells

A spreadsheet is a computer application for computation, organization, analysis and storage of data in tabular form. Spreadsheets were developed as computerized analogs of paper accounting worksheets. The program operates on data entered in cells of a table. Each cell may contain either numeric or text data, or the results of formulas that automatically calculate and display a value based on the contents of other cells. The term spreadsheet may also refer to one such electronic document.

In modern spreadsheet applications, several spreadsheets, often known as "worksheets" or simply "sheets", are gathered together to form a "workbook". A workbook is physically represented by a file containing all the data for the book, the sheets, and the cells with the sheets. Worksheets are normally represented by tabs that flip between pages, each one containing one of the sheets, although Numbers changes this model significantly. Cells in a multi-sheet book add the sheet name to their reference, for instance, "Sheet 1!C10". Some systems extend this syntax to allow cell references to different workbooks.

Spreadsheet users can adjust any stored value and observe the effects on calculated values. This makes the spreadsheet useful for "what-if" analysis since many cases can be rapidly investigated without manual recalculation. Modern spreadsheet software can have multiple interacting sheets and can display data either as text and numerals or in graphical form.

Besides performing basic arithmetic and mathematical functions, modern spreadsheets provide built-in functions for common financial accountancy and statistical operations. Such calculations as net present value, standard deviation, or regression analysis can be applied to tabular data with a pre-programmed function in a formula. Spreadsheet programs also provide conditional expressions, functions to convert between text and numbers, and functions that operate on strings of text.

Spreadsheets have replaced paper-based systems throughout the business world. Although they were first developed for accounting or bookkeeping tasks, they now are used extensively in any context where tabular lists are built, sorted, and shared.

== Basics ==
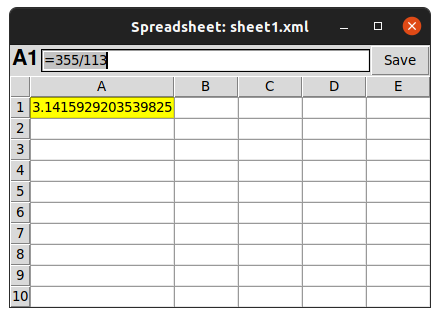

LANPAR, introduced by Remy Landau and Rene Pardo in 1969, was the first electronic spreadsheet on mainframe and time sharing computers. VisiCalc (1979) was the first electronic spreadsheet on a microcomputer, and it became the killer application for the Apple II. Lotus 1-2-3 was the leading spreadsheet when IBM PC DOS / MS-DOS was the dominant operating system. Microsoft Excel now has the largest market share for Windows and Mac. A spreadsheet program is a standard feature of an office productivity suite. In 2006, Google launched a spreadsheet web application; it is now known as Google Sheets and one of the applications provided in Google Drive.

A spreadsheet consists of a table of cells arranged into rows and columns and referred to by the X and Y locations. X locations, the columns, are normally represented by letters, "A," "B," "C," etc., while rows are normally represented by numbers, 1, 2, 3, etc. A single cell can be referred to by addressing its row and column, "C10". This electronic concept of cell references was first introduced in LANPAR and a variant used in VisiCalc and known as "A1 notation". Additionally, spreadsheets have the concept of a range, a group of cells, normally contiguous. For instance, one can refer to the first ten cells in the first column with the range "A1:A10". LANPAR innovated forward referencing/natural order calculation which didn't re-appear until Lotus 123 and Microsoft's MultiPlan Version 2.

Users interact with sheets primarily through the cells. A given cell can hold data by simply entering it in, or a formula, which is normally created by preceding the text with an equals sign. Data might include the string of text hello world, the number 5 or the date 10-Sep-97. A formula would begin with the equals sign, =5*3, but this would normally be invisible because the display shows the result of the calculation, 15 in this case, not the formula itself. This may lead to confusion in some cases.

The key feature of spreadsheets is the ability for a formula to refer to the contents of other cells, which may, in turn, be the result of a formula. To make such a formula, one replaces a number with a cell reference. For instance, the formula =5*C10 would produce the result of multiplying the value in cell C10 by the number 5. If C10 holds the value 3 the result will be 15. But C10 might also hold its formula referring to other cells, and so on.

A spreadsheet's concatenation ("&") function can be used to assemble complex text strings in a single cell (in this example, XML code for an SVG "circle" element). This concatenation is a variation of the chaining of formulas, for which spreadsheets are commonly used.

The ability to chain formulas together is what gives a spreadsheet its power. Many problems can be broken down into a series of individual mathematical steps, and these can be assigned to individual formulas in cells. Some of these formulas can apply to ranges as well, like the SUM function that adds up all the numbers within a range.

Spreadsheets share many principles and traits of databases, but spreadsheets and databases are not the same things. A spreadsheet is essentially just one table, whereas a database is a collection of many tables with machine-readable semantic relationships. While it is true that a workbook that contains three sheets is indeed a file containing multiple tables that can interact with each other, it lacks the relational structure of a database. Spreadsheets and databases are interoperable—sheets can be imported into databases to become tables within them, and database queries can be exported into spreadsheets for further analysis.

A spreadsheet program is one of the main components of an office productivity suite, which usually also contains a word processor, a presentation program, and a database management system. Programs within a suite use similar commands for similar functions. Usually, sharing data between the components is easier than with a non-integrated collection of functionally equivalent programs. This was particularly an advantage at a time when many personal computer systems used text-mode displays and commands instead of a graphical user interface.

== History ==
=== Paper spreadsheets ===
Humans have organized data into tables—that is, grids of columns and rows—since ancient times. The Babylonians used clay tablets to store data as far back as 1800 BCE. Other examples can be found in book-keeping ledgers and astronomical records.

Since at least 1906 the term "spread sheet" has been used in accounting to mean a grid of columns and rows in a ledger. Prior to the rise of computerized spreadsheets, "spread" also referred to a newspaper or magazine item (text or graphics) that covers two facing pages, extending across the centerfold and treating the two pages as one large page. The compound word 'spread-sheet' came to mean the format used to present book-keeping ledgers—with columns for categories of expenditures across the top, invoices listed down the left margin, and the amount of each payment in the cell where its row and column intersect—which were, traditionally, a "spread" across facing pages of a bound ledger (book for keeping accounting records) or on oversized sheets of paper (termed 'analysis paper') ruled into rows and columns in that format and approximately twice as wide as ordinary paper.

=== Electronic spreadsheets ===
==== Batch spreadsheet report generator BSRG ====
A batch "spreadsheet" is indistinguishable from a batch compiler with added input data, producing an output report, i.e., a 4GL or conventional, non-interactive, batch computer program. However, this concept of an electronic spreadsheet was outlined in the 1961 paper "Budgeting Models and System Simulation" by Richard Mattessich. The subsequent work by Mattessich (1964a, Chpt. 9, Accounting and Analytical Methods) and its companion volume, Mattessich (1964b, Simulation of the Firm through a Budget Computer Program) applied computerized spreadsheets to accounting and budgeting systems (on mainframe computers programmed in FORTRAN IV). These batch Spreadsheets dealt primarily with the addition or subtraction of entire columns or rows (of input variables), rather than individual cells.

In 1962, this concept of the spreadsheet, called BCL for Business Computer Language, was implemented on an IBM 1130 and in 1963 was ported to an IBM 7040 by R. Brian Walsh at Marquette University, Wisconsin. This program was written in Fortran. Primitive timesharing was available on those machines. In 1968 BCL was ported by Walsh to the IBM 360/67 timesharing machine at Washington State University. It was used to assist in the teaching of finance to business students. Students were able to take information prepared by the professor and manipulate it to represent it and show ratios etc. In 1964, a book entitled Business Computer Language was written by Kimball, Stoffells and Walsh. Both the book and program were copyrighted in 1966 and years later that copyright was renewed.

In the late 1960s, Xerox used BCL to develop a more sophisticated version for their timesharing system.

==== LANPAR spreadsheet compiler ====
A key invention in the development of electronic spreadsheets was made by Rene K. Pardo and Remy Landau, who filed in 1970 U.S. patent 4,398,249 on a spreadsheet automatic natural order calculation algorithm. While the patent was initially rejected by the patent office as being a purely mathematical invention, following 12 years of appeals, Pardo and Landau won a landmark court case at the Predecessor Court of the Federal Circuit (CCPA), overturning the Patent Office in 1983 — establishing that "something does not cease to become patentable merely because the point of novelty is in an algorithm." However, in 1995 a federal district court ruled the patent unenforceable due to inequitable conduct by the inventors during the application process. The United States Court of Appeals for the Federal Circuit upheld that decision in 1996.

The software was called LANPAR — LANguage for Programming Arrays at Random. (Note: This is evidently a backronym, as the name is also a portmanteau of the developers' names.) This was conceived and entirely developed in the summer of 1969, following Pardo and Landau's recent graduation from Harvard University. Co-inventor Rene Pardo recalls that he felt that one manager at Bell Canada should not have to depend on programmers to program and modify budgeting forms, and he thought of letting users type out forms in any order and having an electronic computer calculate results in the right order ("Forward Referencing/Natural Order Calculation"). Pardo and Landau developed and implemented the software in 1969.

LANPAR was used by Bell Canada, AT&T, and the 18 operating telephone companies nationwide for their local and national budgeting operations. LANPAR was also used by General Motors. Its uniqueness was Pardo's co-invention incorporating forward referencing/natural order calculation (one of the first "non-procedural" computer languages) as opposed to the left-to-right, top-to-bottom sequence for calculating the results in each cell that was used by VisiCalc, SuperCalc, and the first version of MultiPlan. Without forward referencing/natural order calculation, the user had to refresh the spreadsheet until the values in all cells remained unchanged. Once the cell values stayed constant, the user was assured that there were no remaining uncalculated forward references within the spreadsheet.

==== Autoplan/Autotab spreadsheet programming language ====
In 1968, three former employees from the General Electric computer company headquartered in Phoenix, Arizona set out to start their own software development house. A. Leroy Ellison, Harry N. Cantrell, and Russell E. Edwards found themselves doing a large number of calculations when making tables for the business plans that they were presenting to venture capitalists. They decided to save themselves a lot of effort and wrote a computer program that produced their tables for them. This program, originally conceived as a simple utility for their personal use, would turn out to be the first software product offered by the company that would become known as Capex Corporation. "AutoPlan" ran on GE's Time-sharing service; afterward, a version that ran on IBM mainframes was introduced under the name AutoTab. (National CSS offered a similar product, CSSTAB, which had a moderate timesharing user base by the early 1970s. A major application was opinion research tabulation.)

AutoPlan/AutoTab was not a WYSIWYG interactive spreadsheet program, it was a simple scripting language for spreadsheets. The user defined the names and labels for the rows and columns, then the formulas that defined each row or column. In 1975, Autotab-II was advertised as extending the original to a maximum of "1,500 rows and columns, combined in any proportion the user requires..."

GE Information Services, which operated the time-sharing service, also launched its own spreadsheet system, Financial Analysis Language (FAL), circa 1974. It was later supplemented by an additional spreadsheet language, TABOL, which was developed by an independent author, Oliver Vellacott in the UK. Both FAL and TABOL were integrated with GEIS's database system, DMS.

==== IBM Financial Planning and Control System ====
The IBM Financial Planning and Control System was developed in 1976, by Brian Ingham at IBM Canada. It was implemented by IBM in at least 30 countries. It ran on an IBM mainframe and was the first application for financial planning developed with APL that completely hid the programming language from the end-user. Through IBM's VM operating system, it was among the first programs to auto-update each copy of the application as new versions were released. Users could specify simple mathematical relationships between rows and between columns. Compared to any contemporary alternatives, it could support very large spreadsheets. It loaded actual financial planning data drawn from the legacy batch system into each user's spreadsheet monthly. It was designed to optimize the power of APL through object kernels, increasing program efficiency by as much as 50 fold over traditional programming approaches.

==== APLDOT modeling language ====
An example of an early "industrial weight" spreadsheet was APLDOT, developed in 1976 at the United States Railway Association on an IBM 360/91, running at The Johns Hopkins University Applied Physics Laboratory in Laurel, MD. The application was used successfully for many years in developing such applications as financial and costing models for the US Congress and for Conrail. APLDOT was dubbed a "spreadsheet" because financial analysts and strategic planners used it to solve the same problems they addressed with paper spreadsheet pads.

=== VisiCalc for the Apple II ===
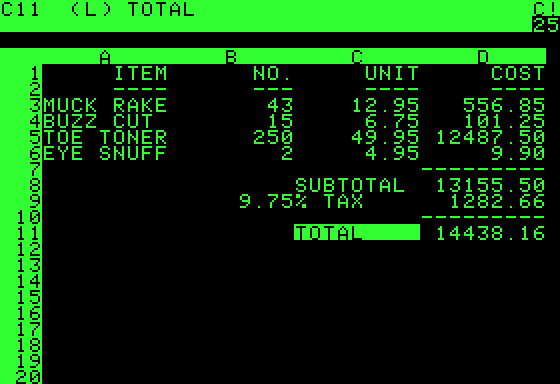
VisiCalc running on an Apple II

The concept of spreadsheets became widely known due to VisiCalc, developed for the Apple II in 1979 by VisiCorp staff Dan Bricklin and Bob Frankston. Significantly, it also turned the personal computer from a hobby for computer enthusiasts into a business tool.

VisiCalc was the first spreadsheet that combined many of the essential features of modern spreadsheet applications, such as a WYSIWYG interactive user interface, automatic recalculation, status and formula lines, range copying with relative and absolute references, and formula building by selecting referenced cells. Unaware of LANPAR at the time, PC World magazine called VisiCalc the first electronic spreadsheet.

Bricklin has spoken of watching his university professor create a table of calculation results on a blackboard. When the professor found an error, he had to tediously erase and rewrite several sequential entries in the table, triggering Bricklin to think that he could replicate the process on a computer, using the blackboard as the model to view results of underlying formulas. His idea became VisiCalc.

VisiCalc for the Apple II went on to become the first killer application, a program so compelling, people would buy a particular computer just to use it. It was ported to other computers, including CP/M machines, Atari 8-bit computers, and the Commodore PET, but VisiCalc remains best known as an Apple II program.

=== SuperCalc for CP/M ===
SuperCalc was a spreadsheet application published by Sorcim in 1980, and originally bundled (along with WordStar) as part of the CP/M software package included with the Osborne 1 portable computer. It quickly became the de facto standard spreadsheet for CP/M.

=== Lotus 1-2-3 spreadsheet for IBM PC DOS ===
The introduction of Lotus 1-2-3 in November 1982 accelerated the acceptance of the IBM Personal Computer. It was written especially for IBM PC DOS and had improvements in speed and graphics compared to VisiCalc on the Apple II, this helped it grow in popularity. Lotus 1-2-3 was the leading spreadsheet for several years.

=== Microsoft Excel for Apple Macintosh and Windows ===
Microsoft released the first version of Excel for the Apple Macintosh on September 30, 1985, and then ported it to Windows, with the first version being numbered 2.05 (to synchronize with the Macintosh version 2.2) and released in November 1987. Microsoft's Windows 3.x platforms of the early 1990s made it possible for their Excel spreadsheet application to take market share from Lotus. By the time Lotus responded with usable Windows products, Microsoft had begun to assemble their Office suite. By 1995, Excel was the market leader, edging out Lotus 1-2-3, and in 2013, IBM discontinued Lotus 1-2-3 altogether.

=== Google Sheets, Online, Web-based spreadsheets ===
In 2006 Google launched their beta release Google Sheets, a web based spreadsheet application that can be accessed by multiple users from any device type using a compatible web browser, it can be used online and offline (with or without internet connectivity). Google Sheets originated from a web-based spreadsheet application XL2Web developed by 2Web Technologies, combined with DocVerse which enabled multiple-user online collaboration of Office documents.

In 2016 Collabora Online Calc was launched, notable in that the web based spreadsheet could be hosted and integrated into any environment without dependency on a 3rd party for authentication or maintenance. Collabora Online runs LibreOffice kit at its core, which grew from StarOffice that was launched 41 years ago in 1985.

=== Mainframe spreadsheets ===
- The Works Records System at ICI developed in 1974 on IBM 370/145
- ExecuCalc, from Parallax Systems, Inc.: Released in late 1982, ExecuCalc was the first mainframe "visi-clone" which duplicated the features of VisiCalc on IBM mainframes with 3270 display terminals. Over 150 copies were licensed (35 to Fortune 500 companies). DP managers were attracted to compatibility and avoiding then-expensive PC purchases (see 1983 Computerworld magazine front page article and advertisement.)

=== Other spreadsheets ===
Notable current spreadsheet software:

- Apache OpenOffice Calc is free and open-source.
- Calligra Sheets (formerly KCalc)
- Collabora Online Calc for mobile and desktop apps are free, open-source, cross-platform enterprise-ready editions of LibreOffice.
- Corel Quattro Pro (WordPerfect Office)
- Gnumeric is a free spreadsheet by the GNU project
- Kingsoft Spreadsheets
- LibreOffice Calc is free, open-source and cross platform.
- Numbers is Apple Inc.'s spreadsheet software, part of iWork.
- OnlyOffice Docs Spreadsheet editor is free and open source.
- PlanMaker (SoftMaker Office)
- Pyspread

Discontinued spreadsheet software:

- 20/20
- 3D-Calc for Atari ST computers
- As Easy As
- Framework by Forefront Corporation/Ashton-Tate (1983–84)
- GNU Oleo – A traditional terminal mode spreadsheet for UNIX/UNIX-like systems
- IBM Lotus Symphony (2007)
- Javelin Software
- KCells
- Lucid 3-D
- Lotus Improv
- Lotus Jazz for Macintosh
- Lotus Symphony (1984)
- MultiPlan
- Claris' Resolve (Macintosh)
- NeoOffice
- Resolver One
- Borland's Quattro Pro
- SC IM (formerly SC - Spreadsheet Calculator)
- SIAG
- SuperCalc
- T/Maker
- Target Planner Calc for CP/M and TRS-DOS
- Wingz for Macintosh

=== Other products ===
Several companies have attempted to break into the spreadsheet market with programs based on very different paradigms. Lotus introduced what is likely the most successful example, Lotus Improv, which saw some commercial success, notably in the financial world where its powerful data mining capabilities remain well respected to this day.

Spreadsheet 2000 attempted to dramatically simplify formula construction, but was generally not successful.

== Concepts ==
The main concepts are those of a grid of cells, called a sheet, with either raw data, called values, or formulas in the cells. Formulas say how to mechanically compute new values from existing values. Values are general numbers, but can also be pure text, dates, months, etc. Extensions of these concepts include logical spreadsheets. Various tools for programming sheets, visualizing data, remotely connecting sheets, displaying cells' dependencies, etc. are commonly provided.

=== Cells ===
A "cell" can be thought of as a box for holding data. A single cell is usually referenced by its column and row (C2 would represent the cell containing the value 30 in the example table below). Usually rows, representing the dependent variables, are referenced in decimal notation starting from 1, while columns representing the independent variables use 26-adic bijective numeration using the letters A-Z as numerals. Its physical size can usually be tailored to its content by dragging its height or width at box intersections (or for entire columns or rows by dragging the column- or row-headers).

My Spreadsheet
	A	B	C	D
01	Sales	100000	30000	70000
02	Purchases	25490	30	200

An array of cells is called a sheet or worksheet. It is analogous to an array of variables in a conventional computer program (although certain unchanging values, once entered, could be considered, by the same analogy, constants). In most implementations, many worksheets may be located within a single spreadsheet. A worksheet is simply a subset of the spreadsheet divided for the sake of clarity. Functionally, the spreadsheet operates as a whole and all cells operate as global variables within the spreadsheet (each variable having 'read' access only except its containing cell).

A cell may contain a value or a formula, or it may simply be left empty. By convention, formulas usually begin with = sign.

==== Values ====
A value can be entered from the computer keyboard by directly typing into the cell itself. Alternatively, a value can be based on a formula (see below), which might perform a calculation, display the current date or time, or retrieve external data such as a stock quote or a database value.

The Spreadsheet Value Rule

Computer scientist Alan Kay used the term value rule to summarize a spreadsheet's operation: a cell's value relies solely on the formula the user has typed into the cell. The formula may rely on the value of other cells, but those cells are likewise restricted to user-entered data or formulas. There are no 'side effects' to calculating a formula: the only output is to display the calculated result inside its occupying cell. There is no natural mechanism for permanently modifying the contents of a cell unless the user manually modifies the cell's contents. In the context of programming languages, this yields a limited form of first-order functional programming.

==== Automatic recalculation ====
A standard of spreadsheets since the 1980s, this optional feature eliminates the need to manually request the spreadsheet program to recalculate values (nowadays typically the default option unless specifically 'switched off' for large spreadsheets, usually to improve performance). Some earlier spreadsheets required a manual request to recalculate since the recalculation of large or complex spreadsheets often reduced data entry speed. Many modern spreadsheets still retain this option.

Recalculation generally requires that there are no circular dependencies in a spreadsheet. A dependency graph is a graph that has a vertex for each object to be updated, and an edge connecting two objects whenever one of them needs to be updated earlier than the other. Dependency graphs without circular dependencies form directed acyclic graphs, representations of partial orderings (in this case, across a spreadsheet) that can be relied upon to give a definite result.

==== Real-time update ====
This feature refers to updating a cell's contents periodically with a value from an external source—such as a cell in a "remote" spreadsheet. For shared, Web-based spreadsheets, it applies to "immediately" updating cells another user has updated. All dependent cells must be updated also.

==== Locked cell ====
Once entered, selected cells (or the entire spreadsheet) can optionally be "locked" to prevent accidental overwriting. Typically this would apply to cells containing formulas but might apply to cells containing "constants" such as a kilogram/pounds conversion factor (2.20462262 to eight decimal places). Even though individual cells are marked as locked, the spreadsheet data are not protected until the feature is activated in the file preferences.

==== Data format ====
A cell or range can optionally be defined to specify how the value is displayed. The default display format is usually set by its initial content if not specifically previously set, so that for example "31/12/2007" or "31 Dec 2007" would default to the cell format of date. Similarly adding a % sign after a numeric value would tag the cell as a percentage cell format. The cell contents are not changed by this format, only the displayed value.

Some cell formats such as "numeric" or "currency" can also specify the number of decimal places.

This can allow invalid operations (such as doing multiplication on a cell containing a date), resulting in illogical results without an appropriate warning.

==== Cell formatting ====
Depending on the capability of the spreadsheet application, each cell (like its counterpart the "style" in a word processor) can be separately formatted using the attributes of either the content (point size, color, bold or italic) or the cell (border thickness, background shading, color). To aid the readability of a spreadsheet, cell formatting may be conditionally applied to data; for example, a negative number may be displayed in red.

A cell's formatting does not typically affect its content and depending on how cells are referenced or copied to other worksheets or applications, the formatting may not be carried with the content.

==== Named cells ====
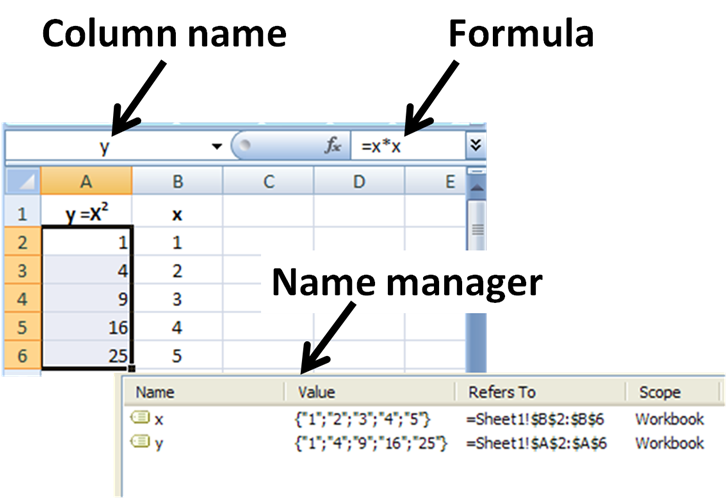
Use of named column variables x & y in Microsoft Excel. Formula for y=x^{2} resembles Fortran, and Name Manager shows the definitions of x & y.

In most implementations, a cell, or group of cells in a column or row, can be "named" enabling the user to refer to those cells by a name rather than by a grid reference. Names must be unique within the spreadsheet, but when using multiple sheets in a spreadsheet file, an identically named cell range on each sheet can be used if it is distinguished by adding the sheet name. One reason for this usage is for creating or running macros that repeat a command across many sheets. Another reason is that formulas with named variables are readily checked against the algebra they are intended to implement (they resemble Fortran expressions). The use of named variables and named functions also makes the spreadsheet structure more transparent.

===== Cell reference =====
In place of a named cell, an alternative approach is to use a cell (or grid) reference. Most cell references indicate another cell in the same sheet, but a cell reference can also refer to a cell in a different sheet within the same spreadsheet, or (depending on the implementation) to a cell in another spreadsheet entirely, or a value from a remote application.

A typical cell reference in "A1" style consists of one or two case-insensitive letters to identify the column (if there are up to 256 columns: A–Z and AA–IV) followed by a row number (e.g., in the range 1–65536). Either part can be relative (it changes when the formula it is in is moved or copied), or absolute (indicated with $ in front of the part concerned of the cell reference). The alternative "R1C1" reference style consists of the letter R, the row number, the letter C, and the column number; relative row or column numbers are indicated by enclosing the number in square brackets. Most current spreadsheets use the A1 style, some providing the R1C1 style as a compatibility option.

When the computer calculates a formula in one cell to update the displayed value of that cell, cell reference(s) in that cell, naming some other cell(s), causes the computer to fetch the value of the named cell(s).

A cell on the same "sheet" is usually addressed as:

=A1

A cell on a different sheet of the same spreadsheet is usually addressed as:

=SHEET2!A1             (that is; the first cell in sheet 2 of the same spreadsheet).

Some spreadsheet implementations in Excel allow cell references to another spreadsheet (not the currently open and active file) on the same computer or a local network. It may also refer to a cell in another open and active spreadsheet on the same computer or network that is defined as shareable. These references contain the complete filename, such as:

='C:\Documents and Settings\Username\My spreadsheets\[main sheet]Sheet1!A1

In a spreadsheet, references to cells automatically update when new rows or columns are inserted or deleted. Care must be taken, however, when adding a row immediately before a set of column totals to ensure that the totals reflect the values of the additional rows—which they often do not.

A circular reference occurs when the formula in one cell refers—directly, or indirectly through a chain of cell references—to another cell that refers back to the first cell. Many common errors cause circular references. However, some valid techniques use circular references. These techniques, after many spreadsheet recalculations, (usually) converge on the correct values for those cells.

===== Cell ranges =====
Likewise, instead of using a named range of cells, a range reference can be used. A reference to a range of cells typically takes the form (A1:A6), which specifies all the cells in column A from row 1 through row 6. A formula such as "=SUM(A1:A6)" would add all the cells specified and put the result in the cell containing the formula itself.

=== Sheets ===
In the earliest spreadsheets, cells were a simple two-dimensional grid. Over time, the model has expanded to include a third dimension, and in some cases a series of named grids, called sheets. The most advanced examples allow inversion and rotation operations which can slice and project the data set in various ways.

=== Formulas ===
Animation of a simple spreadsheet that multiplies values in the left column by 2, then sums the calculated values from the right column to the bottom-most cell. In this example, only the values in the A column are entered (10, 20, 30), and the remainder of cells are formulas. Formulas in the B column multiply values from the A column using relative references, and the formula in B4 uses the SUM() function to find the sum of values in the B1:B3 range.

A formula identifies the calculation needed to place the result in the cell it is contained within. A cell containing a formula, therefore, has two display components; the formula itself and the resulting value. The formula is normally only shown when the cell is selected by "clicking" the mouse over a particular cell; otherwise, it contains the result of the calculation.

A formula assigns values to a cell or range of cells, and typically has the format:

=expression

where the expression consists of:

- values, such as 2, 9.14 or 6.67E-11;
- references to other cells, such as, e.g., A1 for a single cell or B1:B3 for a range;
- arithmetic operators, such as +, -, *, /, and others;
- relational operators, such as >=, <, and others; and,
- functions, such as SUM(), TAN(), and many others.

When a cell contains a formula, it often contains references to other cells. Such a cell reference is a type of variable. Its value is the value of the referenced cell or some derivation of it. If that cell in turn references other cells, the value depends on the values of those. References can be relative (e.g., A1, or B1:B3), absolute (e.g., $A$1, or $B$1:$B$3) or mixed row– or column-wise absolute/relative (e.g., $A1 is column-wise absolute and A$1 is row-wise absolute).

The available options for valid formulas depend on the particular spreadsheet implementation but, in general, most arithmetic operations and quite complex nested conditional operations can be performed by most of today's commercial spreadsheets. Modern implementations also offer functions to access custom-build functions, remote data, and applications.

A formula may contain a condition (or nested conditions)—with or without an actual calculation—and is sometimes used purely to identify and highlight errors. In the example below, it is assumed the sum of a column of percentages (A1 through A6) is tested for validity and an explicit message put into the adjacent right-hand cell.

=IF(SUM(A1:A6) > 100, "More than 100%", SUM(A1:A6))

Further examples:

=IF(AND(A1<>"",B1<>""),A1/B1,"") means that if both cells A1 and B1 are not <> empty "", then divide A1 by B1 and display, other do not display anything.
=IF(AND(A1<>"",B1<>""),IF(B1<>0,A1/B1,"Division by zero"),"") means that if cells A1 and B1 are not empty, and B1 is not zero, then divide A1 by B1, if B1 is zero, then display "Division by zero", and do not display anything if either A1 and B1 are empty.
=IF(OR(A1<>"",B1<>""),"Either A1 or B1 show text","") means to display the text if either cells A1 or B1 are not empty.

The best way to build up conditional statements is step by step composing followed by trial and error testing and refining code.

A spreadsheet does not have to contain any formulas at all, in which case it could be considered merely a collection of data arranged in rows and columns (a database) like a calendar, timetable, or simple list. Because of its ease of use, formatting, and hyperlinking capabilities, many spreadsheets are used solely for this purpose.

=== Functions ===
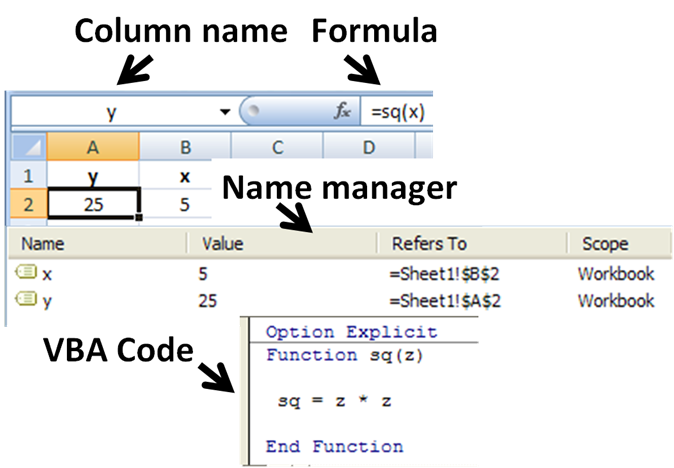
Use of user-defined function sq(x) in Microsoft Excel

Spreadsheets usually contain several supplied functions, such as arithmetic operations (for example, summations, averages, and so forth), trigonometric functions, statistical functions, and so forth. In addition there is often a provision for user-defined functions. In Microsoft Excel, these functions are defined using Visual Basic for Applications in the supplied Visual Basic editor, and such functions are automatically accessible on the worksheet. Also, programs can be written that pull information from the worksheet, perform some calculations, and report the results back to the worksheet. In the figure, the name sq is user-assigned, and the function sq is introduced using the Visual Basic editor supplied with Excel. Name Manager displays the spreadsheet definitions of named variables x & y.

=== Subroutines ===
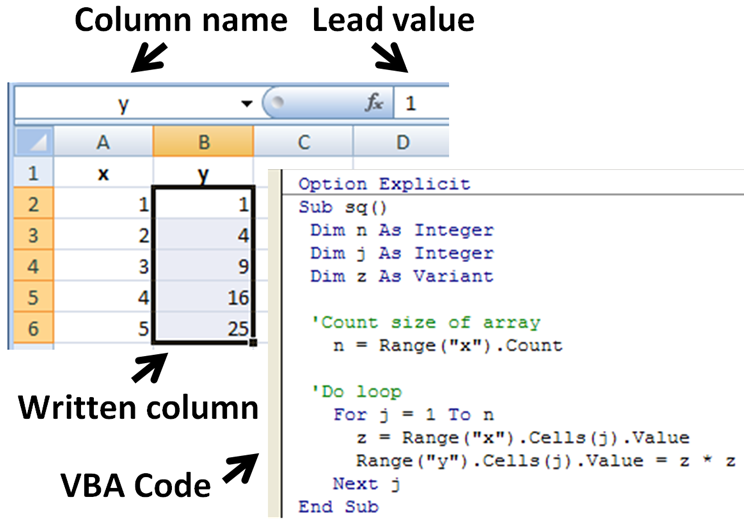
Subroutine in Microsoft Excel writes values calculated using x into y.

Functions themselves cannot write into the worksheet but simply return their evaluation. However, in Microsoft Excel, subroutines can write values or text found within the subroutine directly to the spreadsheet. The figure shows the Visual Basic code for a subroutine that reads each member of the named column variable x, calculates its square, and writes this value into the corresponding element of named column variable y. The y column contains no formula because its values are calculated in the subroutine, not on the spreadsheet, and simply are written in.

=== Remote spreadsheet ===
Whenever a reference is made to a cell or group of cells that are not located within the current physical spreadsheet file, it is considered as accessing a "remote" spreadsheet. The contents of the referenced cell may be accessed either on the first reference with a manual update or more recently in the case of web-based spreadsheets, as a near real-time value with a specified automatic refresh interval.

=== Charts ===
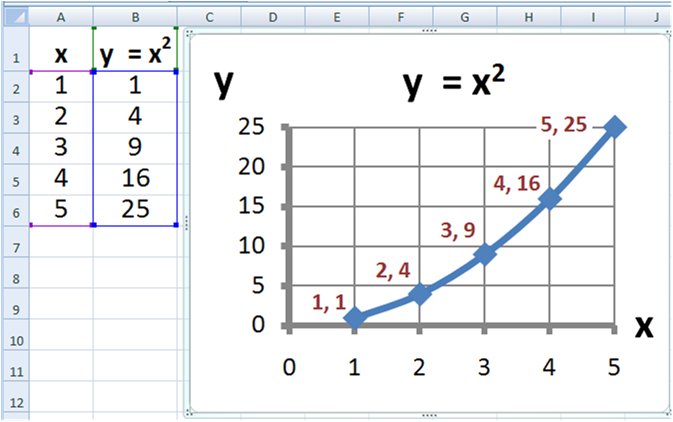
Graph made using Microsoft Excel

Many spreadsheet applications permit charts and graphs (e.g., histograms, pie charts) to be generated from specified groups of cells that are dynamically re-built as cell contents change. The generated graphic component can either be embedded within the current sheet or added as a separate object. To create an Excel histogram, a formula based on the REPT function can be used.

=== Multi-dimensional spreadsheets ===
In the late 1980s and early 1990s, first Javelin Software and Lotus Improv appeared. Unlike models in a conventional spreadsheet, they utilized models built on objects called variables, not on data in cells of a report. These multi-dimensional spreadsheets enabled viewing data and algorithms in various self-documenting ways, including simultaneous multiple synchronized views. For example, users of Javelin could move through the connections between variables on a diagram while seeing the logical roots and branches of each variable. This is an example of what is perhaps its primary contribution of the earlier Javelin—the concept of traceability of a user's logic or model structure through its twelve views. A complex model can be dissected and understood by others who had no role in its creation.

In these programs, a time series, or any variable, was an object in itself, not a collection of cells that happen to appear in a row or column. Variables could have many attributes, including complete awareness of their connections to all other variables, data references, and text and image notes. Calculations were performed on these objects, as opposed to a range of cells, so adding two-time series automatically aligns them in calendar time, or in a user-defined time frame. Data were independent of worksheets—variables, and therefore data, could not be destroyed by deleting a row, column, or entire worksheet. For instance, January's costs are subtracted from January's revenues, regardless of where or whether either appears in a worksheet. This permits actions later used in pivot tables, except that flexible manipulation of report tables, was but one of many capabilities supported by variables. Moreover, if costs were entered by week and revenues by month, the program could allocate or interpolate as appropriate. This object design enabled variables and whole models to reference each other with user-defined variable names and to perform multidimensional analysis and massive, but easily editable consolidations.

=== Logical spreadsheets ===
Spreadsheets that have a formula language based upon logical expressions, rather than arithmetic expressions are known as logical spreadsheets. Such spreadsheets can be used to reason deductively about their cell values.

== Programming issues ==
Just as the early programming languages were designed to generate spreadsheet printouts, programming techniques themselves have evolved to process tables (also known as spreadsheets or matrices) of data more efficiently in the computer itself.

=== End-user development ===
Spreadsheets are a popular end-user development tool. EUD denotes activities or techniques in which people who are not professional developers create automated behavior and complex data objects without significant knowledge of a programming language. Many people find it easier to perform calculations in spreadsheets than by writing the equivalent sequential program. This is due to several traits of spreadsheets.

- They use spatial relationships to define program relationships. Humans have highly developed intuitions about spaces, and of dependencies between items. Sequential programming usually requires typing line after line of text, which must be read slowly and carefully to be understood and changed.
- They are forgiving, allowing partial results and functions to work. One or more parts of a program can work correctly, even if other parts are unfinished or broken. This makes writing and debugging programs easier, and faster. Sequential programming usually needs every program line and character to be correct for a program to run. One error usually stops the whole program and prevents any result. Though this user-friendliness is a benefit of spreadsheet development, it often comes with an increased risk of errors.
- Modern spreadsheets allow for secondary notation. The program can be annotated with colors, typefaces, lines, etc. to provide visual cues about the meaning of elements in the program.
- Extensions that allow users to create new functions can provide the capabilities of a functional language.
- Extensions that allow users to build and apply models from the domain of machine learning.
- Spreadsheets are versatile. With their Boolean logic and graphics capabilities, even electronic circuit design is possible.
- Spreadsheets can store relational data and spreadsheet formulas can express all queries of SQL. There exists a query translator, which automatically generates the spreadsheet implementation from the SQL code.

=== Spreadsheet programs ===
A "spreadsheet program" is designed to perform general computation tasks using spatial relationships rather than time as the primary organizing principle.

It is often convenient to think of a spreadsheet as a mathematical graph, where the nodes are spreadsheet cells, and the edges are references to other cells specified in formulas. This is often called the dependency graph of the spreadsheet. References between cells can take advantage of spatial concepts such as relative position and absolute position, as well as named locations, to make the spreadsheet formulas easier to understand and manage.

Spreadsheets usually attempt to automatically update cells when the cells depend on change. The earliest spreadsheets used simple tactics like evaluating cells in a particular order, but modern spreadsheets calculate following a minimal recomputation order from the dependency graph. Later spreadsheets also include a limited ability to propagate values in reverse, altering source values so that a particular answer is reached in a certain cell. Since spreadsheet cell formulas are not generally invertible, though, this technique is of somewhat limited value.

Many of the concepts common to sequential programming models have analogs in the spreadsheet world. For example, the sequential model of the indexed loop is usually represented as a table of cells, with similar formulas (normally differing only in which cells they reference).

Spreadsheets have evolved to use scripting programming languages like VBA as a tool for extensibility beyond what the spreadsheet language makes easy.

== Shortcomings ==
While spreadsheets represented a major step forward in quantitative modeling, they have deficiencies. Their shortcomings include the perceived unfriendliness of alpha-numeric cell addresses.

- Research by ClusterSeven has shown huge discrepancies in the way financial institutions and corporate entities understand, manage and police their often vast estates of spreadsheets and unstructured financial data (including comma-separated values (CSV) files and Microsoft Access databases). One study in early 2011 of nearly 1,500 people in the UK found that 57% of spreadsheet users have never received formal training on the spreadsheet package they use. 72% said that no internal department checks their spreadsheets for accuracy. Only 13% said that Internal Audit reviews their spreadsheets, while a mere 1% receive checks from their risk department.
- Spreadsheets can have reliability problems. Research studies estimate that around 1% of all formulas in operational spreadsheets are in error.

Despite the high error risks often associated with spreadsheet authorship and use, specific steps can be taken to significantly enhance control and reliability by structurally reducing the likelihood of error occurrence at their source.

- The practical expressiveness of spreadsheets can be limited unless their modern features are used. Several factors contribute to this limitation. Implementing a complex model on a cell-at-a-time basis requires tedious attention to detail. Authors have difficulty remembering the meanings of hundreds or thousands of cell addresses that appear in formulas.

These drawbacks are mitigated by the use of named variables for cell designations, and employing variables in formulas rather than cell locations and cell-by-cell manipulations. Graphs can be used to show instantly how results are changed by changes in parameter values. The spreadsheet can be made invisible except for a transparent user interface that requests pertinent input from the user, displays results requested by the user, creates reports, and has built-in error traps to prompt correct input.

- Similarly, formulas expressed in terms of cell addresses are hard to keep straight and hard to audit. Research shows that spreadsheet auditors who check numerical results and cell formulas find no more errors than auditors who only check numerical results. That is another reason to use named variables and formulas employing named variables.

Specifically, spreadsheets typically contain many copies of the same formula. When the formula is modified, the user has to change every cell containing that formula. In contrast, most computer languages allow a formula to appear only once in the code and achieve repetition using loops: making them much easier to implement and audit.

- The alteration of a dimension demands major surgery. When rows (or columns) are added to or deleted from a table, one has to adjust the size of many downstream tables that depend on the table being changed. In the process, it is often necessary to move other cells around to make room for the new columns or rows and to adjust graph data sources. In large spreadsheets, this can be extremely time-consuming.
- Adding or removing a dimension is so difficult, one generally has to start over. The spreadsheet as a paradigm forces one to decide on dimensionality right of the beginning of one's spreadsheet creation, even though it is often most natural to make these choices after one's spreadsheet model has matured. The desire to add and remove dimensions also arises in parametric and sensitivity analyses.
- Collaboration in authoring spreadsheet formulas can be difficult when such collaboration occurs at the level of cells and cell addresses.

Other problems associated with spreadsheets include:

- Some sources advocate the use of specialized software instead of spreadsheets for some applications (budgeting, statistics)
- The Microsoft xls file format which is the default file format used in versions prior to 2007 had a capacity limit of 65,536 rows by 256 columns (2^{16} and 2^{8} respectively). This presents a problem for people using larger datasets, and can result in data loss. In spite of the time passed, a recent example is the loss of COVID-19 positives in the British statistics for September and October 2020 when the Microsoft xls file format had been used in a legacy computer system.
- Lack of auditing and revision control. This makes it difficult to determine who changed what and when. This can cause problems with regulatory compliance. Lack of revision control greatly increases the risk of errors due to the inability to track, isolate and test changes made to a document. Modern spreadsheets include revision control.
- Lack of security. Spreadsheets lack controls on who can see and modify particular data. This, combined with the lack of auditing above, can make it easy for someone to commit fraud.
- Because they are loosely structured, it is easy for someone to introduce an error, either accidentally or intentionally, by entering information in the wrong place or expressing dependencies among cells (such as in a formula) incorrectly.
- The results of a formula (example "=A1*B1") applies only to a single cell (that is, the cell the formula is located in—in this case perhaps C1), even though it can "extract" data from many other cells, and even real-time dates and actual times. This means that to cause a similar calculation on an array of cells, an almost identical formula (but residing in its own "output" cell) must be repeated for each row of the "input" array. This differs from a "formula" in a conventional computer program, which typically makes one calculation that it applies to all the input in turn. With current spreadsheets, this forced repetition of near-identical formulas can have detrimental consequences from a quality assurance standpoint and is often the cause of many spreadsheet errors. Some spreadsheets have array formulas to address this issue.
- Trying to manage the sheer volume of spreadsheets that may exist in an organization without proper security, audit trails, the unintentional introduction of errors, and other items listed above can become overwhelming.

While there are built-in and third-party tools for desktop spreadsheet applications that address some of these shortcomings, awareness, and use of these is generally low. Many professionals in the financial field "don't know" how their spreadsheets are audited; only 6% invest in a third-party solution.

== Spreadsheet risk ==
Spreadsheet risk is the risk associated with deriving a materially incorrect value from a spreadsheet application that will be utilized in making a related (usually numerically based) decision. Examples include the valuation of an asset, the determination of financial accounts, the calculation of medicinal doses, or the size of a load-bearing beam for structural engineering. The risk may arise from inputting erroneous or fraudulent data values, from mistakes (or incorrect changes) within the logic of the spreadsheet or the omission of relevant updates (e.g., out of date exchange rates). Some single-instance errors have exceeded US$1 billion. Because spreadsheet risk is principally linked to the actions (or inaction) of individuals it is defined as a sub-category of operational risk.

Despite this, research carried out by ClusterSeven revealed that around half (48%) of c-level executives and senior managers at firms reporting annual revenues over £50m said there were either no usage controls at all or poorly applied manual processes over the use of spreadsheets at the firms.

In 2013 Thomas Herndon, a graduate student of economics at the University of Massachusetts Amherst, found major coding flaws in the spreadsheet used by the economists Carmen Reinhart and Kenneth Rogoff in Growth in a Time of Debt, a very influential 2010 journal article which was widely used as justification to drive 2010–2013 European austerity programs.

== See also ==
- Attribute-value system
- Comparison of spreadsheet software
- Moving and copying in spreadsheets
- List of spreadsheet software
- Model audit
