= Pyspread =

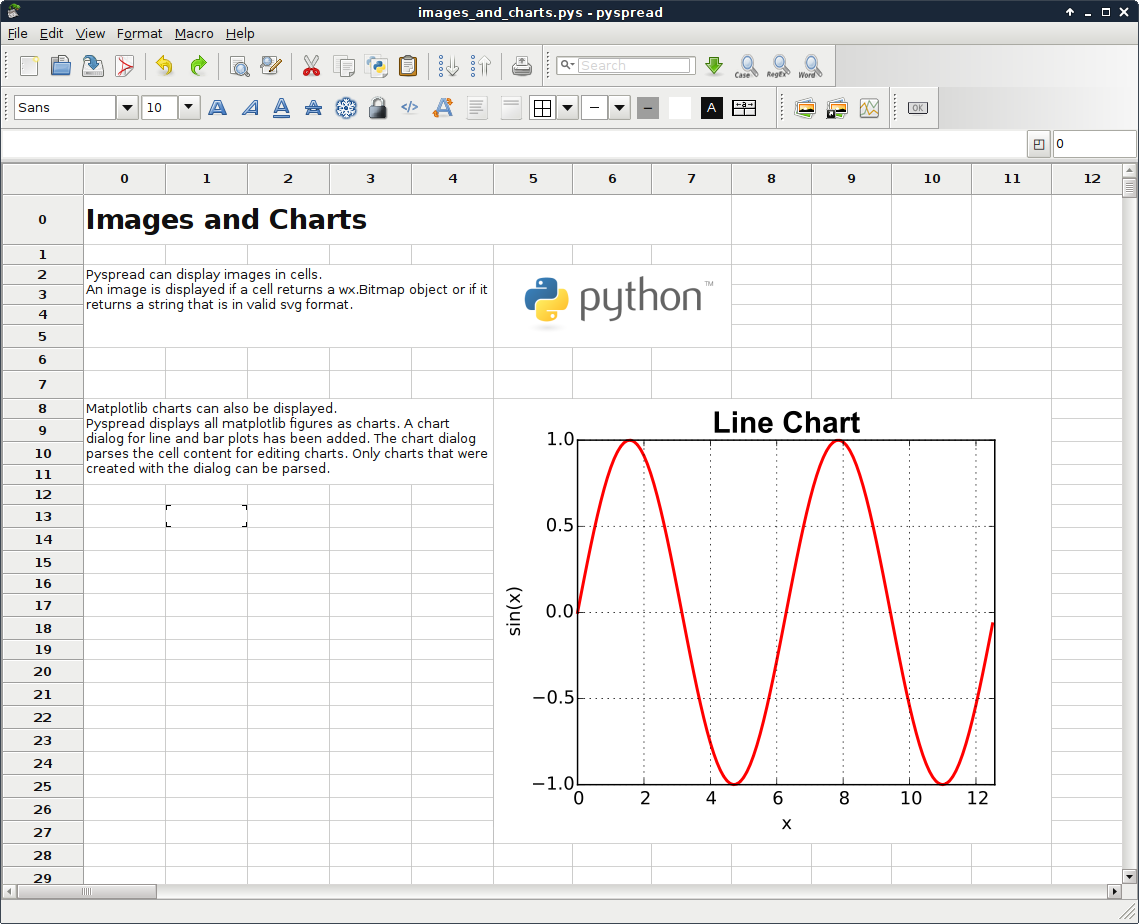
- Original author: Martin Manns
- Stable release: 2.4.5 / 21 April 2026
- Written in: Python
- Operating system: Unix-like, Windows
- Platform: PyQt 6
- Size: 2.3 MB
- Type: Spreadsheet
- License: GPL-3.0-or-later
- Website: pyspread.gitlab.io
- Repository: gitlab.com/pyspread/pyspread

Pyspread is a non-traditional spreadsheet. Cells in pyspread's grid accept expressions in the Python programming language. A cell can return any Python object, which allows calculations with vectors, matrices, fractions, arbitrary precision numbers and symbols. Therefore, pyspread follows an approach that is similar to the spreadsheet SIAG from Siag Office.

Besides text, pyspread can display bitmap and vector images in its cells. It provides a graphical front-end for creating matplotlib charts and starting from version 2.2 R (programming language) charts. Pyspread can import and export data from and to CSV files. Spreadsheets can be exported to files in Portable Document Format and Scalable Vector Graphics format. Pyspread experimentally supports importing Excel xlsx spreadsheets that use a limited set of functions converting them into pure Python using the pycel module.

Pyspread has been mentioned for its capability to access local files and the Web from cell code.

Pyspread runs on Linux and Microsoft Windows. It has been packaged for the Linux distributions Arch, Debian, Mageia, NixOS, Slackware and Ubuntu. Pyspread is developed and maintained by Martin Manns. It is licensed under the GPL-3.0-or-later license and therefore is free software.
