= Siag Office =

Extremely lightweight office suite

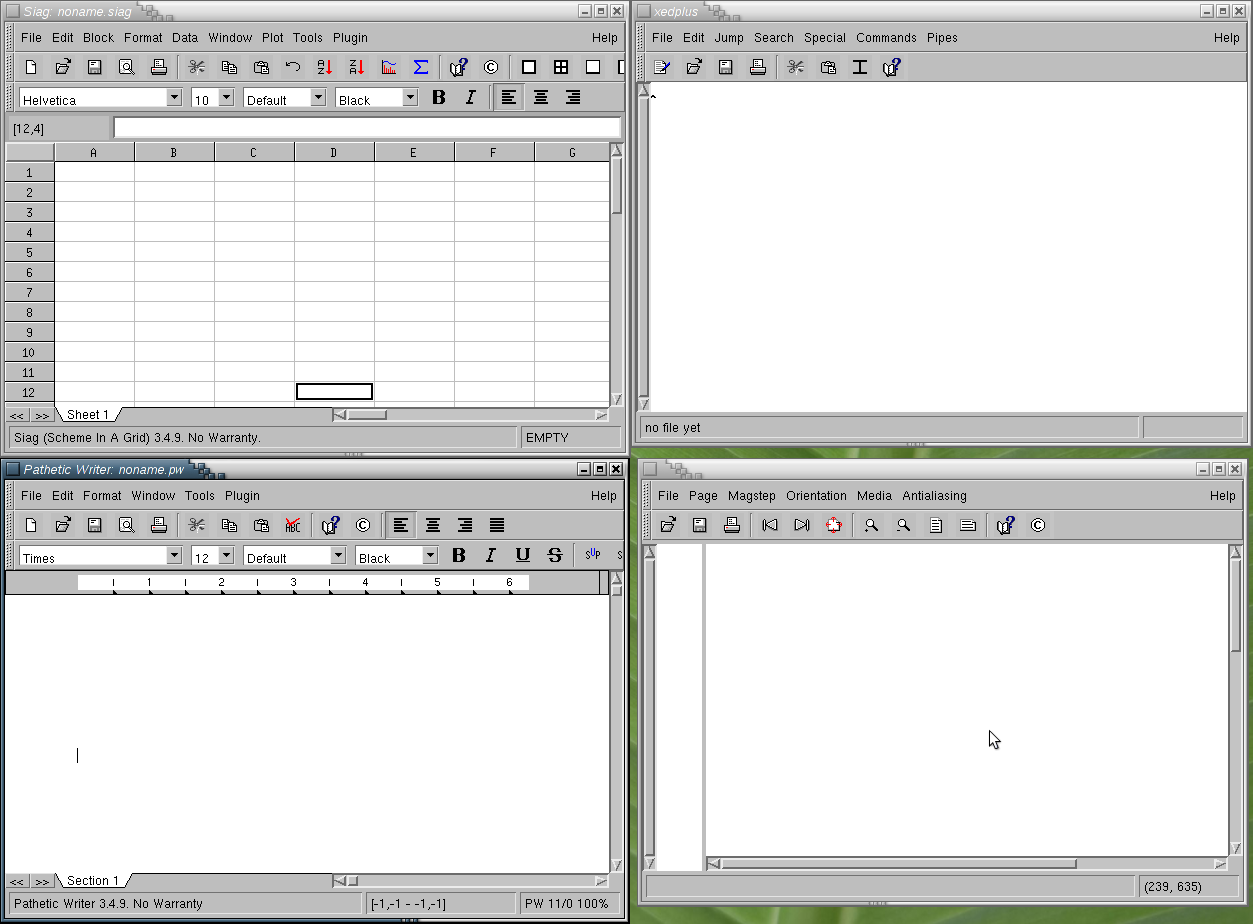
- Original author: Ulric Eriksson
- Initial release: January 17, 1997; 29 years ago
- Stable release: 3.6.1 / 10 November 2006
- Written in: C, Scheme
- Operating system: Linux, Mac OS X, BSD
- Type: Office suite
- License: GPL-2.0-or-later
- Website: siag.nu
- Repository: github.com/UlricE/SiagOffice

Siag Office is a tightly integrated free software office package for Unix-like operating systems. It consists of the spreadsheet SIAG ("Scheme In A Grid"), the word processor Pathetic Writer (PW), the animation program Egon Animator, the text editor XedPlus, the file manager Xfiler and the previewer Gvu.

Siag Office is known to be extremely light-weight, hence able to run on very old systems reasonably well, such as on i486 computers with 16MB RAM. Because it is kept light-weight, the software lacks many of the features of major office suites, like LibreOffice, Calligra Suite, or Microsoft Office. Siag Office is distributed under the terms of the GPL-2.0-or-later license.

Version 3.6.0 was released in 2003, and the latest version 3.6.1 was released in 2006.

Siag Office is included in Damn Small Linux, a lightweight Linux distribution.

== Components ==
=== Siag ===
Siag is the spreadsheet based on the X Window System and the Scheme programming language (specifically using SIOD). The program has existed in several incarnations: text-based curses for SunOS, both text-based VT52 and GEM-based for Atari ST, Turbo C for MS-DOS, Xlib-based for Linux, and Xt-based for POSIX-compliant systems.

It supports import of CSV, Lotus 1-2-3 (.wk1), Scheme Code (.scm), ABScript (.abs), Siag (.siag) native format and partially also Excel XLS files and OpenOffice.org XML (.sxc). It can export files to CSV, TXT, Postscript (.ps), HTML, Lotus 1-2-3 (.wk1), Troff table (.tbl), Latex table (.tex), PDF and its native Siag format.

=== PW ===
PW (Pathetic Writer) is an X-based word processor for Unix. Support for RTF (Rich Text Format) allows documents to be exchanged between Pathetic Writer and legacy Windows applications. External converters such as Caolan McNamara's wv can be used to read virtually any format, including Microsoft Word. HTML pages can be loaded and saved, making it possible to instantly publish PW documents on the web.

=== Egon Animator ===
Egon Animator is the X-based animation development tool for Unix. The idea is that "objects" (rectangles, lines, pixmaps and so on) are added to a "stage" where they are then made to perform by telling them where they should be and when. It can also edit MagicPoint files.

== See also ==
- Comparison of office suites
