= Numbers (spreadsheet) =

Spreadsheet application by Apple

Numbers: Make Spreadsheets

- Numbers 12 on macOS 11 Big Sur
- Developer: Apple
- Stable release: 15.4 / September 29, 2026; 51 days ago
- Operating system: macOS 15.6 or later; iOS 18.0 or later; iPadOS 18.0 or later; visionOS 2.0 or later
- Type: Spreadsheet
- License: Proprietary
- Website: apple.com/numbers

Numbers, officially Numbers: Make Spreadsheets, is a spreadsheet application developed by Apple as part of the iWork productivity suite alongside Keynote and Pages. Numbers is available for iOS and macOS High Sierra or newer. Numbers 1.0 on Mac OS X was announced on August 7, 2007, making it the newest application in the iWork suite. The iPad version was released on January 27, 2010. The app was later updated to support iPhone and iPod Touch.

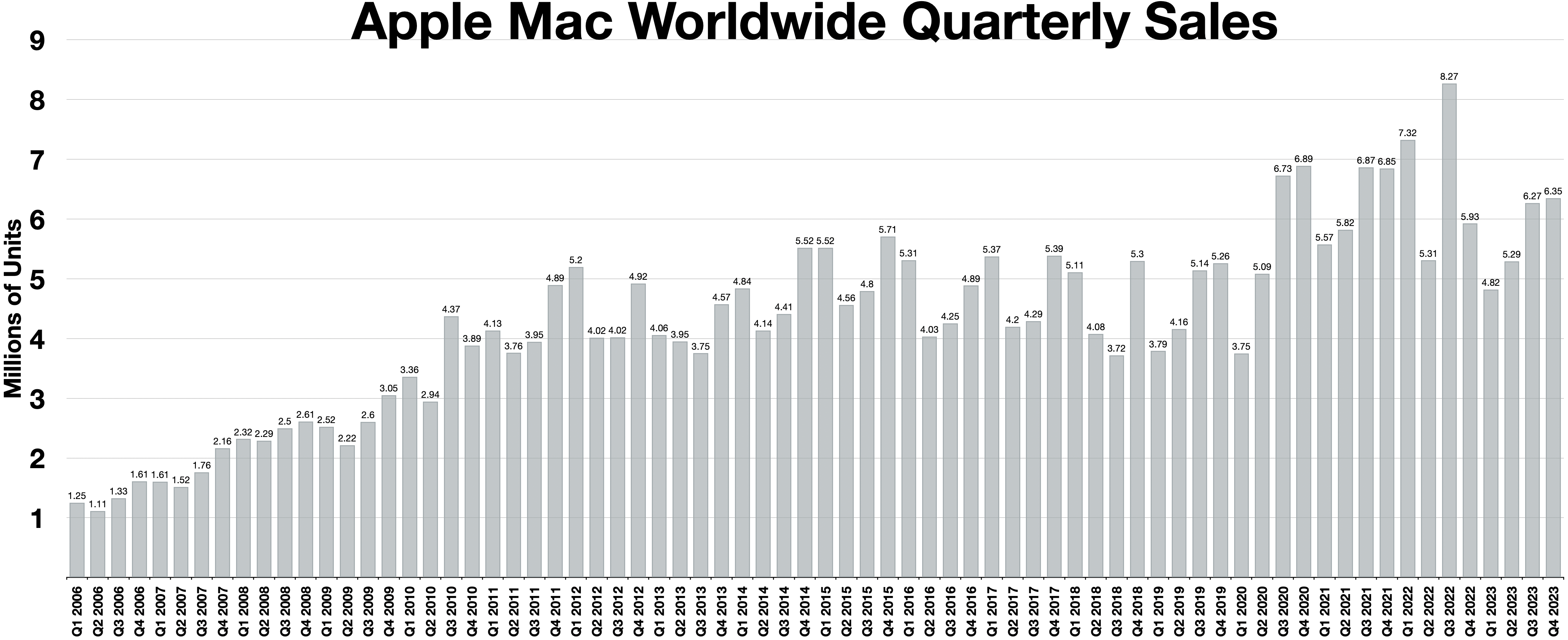
Column chart of Mac worldwide quarterly sales, made with Numbers

Numbers uses a free-form "canvas" approach that demotes tables to one of many different media types placed on a page. Other media, like charts, graphics, and text, are treated as peers. In comparison, traditional spreadsheets like Microsoft Excel use the table as the primary container, with other media placed within the table. Numbers also includes features from the seminal Lotus Improv, notably the use of formulas based on ranges rather than cells. However, it implements these using traditional spreadsheet concepts, as opposed to Improv's use of multidimensional databases.

Numbers also includes numerous stylistic improvements to improve the visual appearance of spreadsheets. At its introductory demonstration, Steve Jobs pitched a more usable interface and better control over the appearance and presentation of tables of data.

As part of the launch of Apple Creator Studio on January 28, 2026, version 15.1 of Numbers for macOS was released as a new app rather than an update to the existing app, which will no longer receive any new features. The iOS and iPadOS versions were unaffected by this and received the update as normal. As part of this, the application moved to a freemium model, with everything remaining free except for the newly added advanced editing features, which require an Apple Creator Studio subscription.

== Description ==
=== Basic model ===
Numbers works in a fashion somewhat different from traditional spreadsheets like Microsoft Excel or Lotus 1-2-3. In the traditional model, the table is the first-class citizen of the system, acting as both the primary interface for work and as the container for other types of media like charts or digital images. In effect, the spreadsheet and the table are the same. In contrast, Numbers uses a separate "canvas" as its basic container object and tables are among the many objects that can be placed within the canvas. (Note: For reasons that are not mentioned in the documentation, canvases are referred to as "sheets" within the program.)

This difference is not simply a case of syntax. To provide a large workspace, conventional spreadsheets extend a table in X and Y to form a very large grid — ideally infinite, but normally limited to some smaller dimension. (Note: Numbers can handle up to 1,000,000 rows by 1,000 columns per table, versus the latest versions of Excel from Office 2010 onwards having a maximum of 1,048,576 rows by 16,384 columns. Excel has changed its maximum size many times, originally 16,384 rows by 128 columns, while other programs of the same era often compared themselves by increasing this, e.g. WingZ was 32,768 by 32,768 for instance.) Some of these cells, selected by the user, hold data. Data is manipulated using formulas, which are placed in other cells in the same sheet and output their results back into the formula cell's display. The rest of the sheet is "sparse", and currently unused.

Sheets often grow very complex with input data, intermediate values from formulas, and output areas, separated by blank areas. To manage this complexity, Excel allows one to hide data that is not of interest, often intermediate values. Quattro Pro commonly introduced the idea of multiple sheets in a single book, allowing further subdivision of the data; Excel implements this as a set of tabs along the bottom of the workbook.

In contrast, Numbers does not have an underlying spreadsheet in the traditional sense but uses multiple individual tables for this purpose. Tables are an X and Y collection of cells, like a sheet, but extend only to the limits of the data they hold. Each section of data or output from formulas can be combined into an existing table or placed into a new table. Tables can be collected by the user onto single or multiple canvases. Whereas a typical Excel sheet has data strewn across it, a Numbers canvas could build the same output through smaller individual tables encompassing the same data.

=== Formulas and functions ===
A newly created Numbers document is styled to indicate suggested header areas in column A and row 1. Note that the table stops in the lower right of the screen, which can be resized with the widget in the corner.

After adding data and headers, Numbers has automatically created named ranges over the data. The ranges were used to create a formula that has populated column D. Note that the same formula can be used for the entire column — the row number is not required.

The table has been resized to show only the used area, moved into the center of the canvas, and styled. A chart has been added above the table. The pane in the upper left shows an object tree, with the "canvas" objects being shown in a hierarchy of each sheet, every sheet can be collapsed or expanded to show the canvas object contained within that sheet.

Consider a simple spreadsheet used to calculate the average value of all car sales in a month for a given year. The sheet might contain the month number or name in column A, the number of cars sold in column B, and the total income in column C. The user wishes to complete the task of "calculating the average income per car sold by dividing the total income by the number of cars sold and putting the resulting average in column D". From the user's perspective, the values in the cells have semantic content, they are "cars sold" and "total income" and they want to manipulate this to produce an output value, "average price".

In traditional spreadsheets, the semantic value of the numbers is lost. The number in cell B2 is not "the number of cars sold in January", but simply "the value in cell B2". The formula for calculating the average is based on the manipulation of the cells, in the form =C2/B2. As the spreadsheet is unaware of the user's desire for D to be an output column, the user copies that formula into all of the cells in D. However, as the formula refers to data on different rows, it must be modified as it is copied into the cells in D, changing it to refer to the correct row. For instance, the formula in D4 would read =C4/B4. Excel automates this later task by using a relative referencing system that works as long as the cells retain their location relative to the formula. However, this system requires Excel to track any changes to the layout of the sheet and adjust the formulas, a process that is far from foolproof.

During the development of Improv, the Lotus team discovered that these sorts of formulas were both difficult to use and resistant to future changes in the spreadsheet layout. Their solution was to make the user explicitly define the semantic content of the sheets — that the B column contained "cars sold". These data ranges were known as "categories". Formulas were written by referring to these categories by name, creating a new category that could be (if desired) placed in the sheet for display. Using the car example, the formula in Improv would be average per car = total income / cars sold. Changes to the layout of the sheet would not affect the formulas; the data remains defined no matter where it is moved. It also meant that formulas calculating intermediate values did not have to be placed in the sheet and normally did not take up room. The downside to Improv's approach is that it demanded more information from the user up-front and was considered less suitable for "quick and dirty" calculations or basic list building.

Numbers uses a hybrid approach to the creation of formulas, supporting the use of named data like Improv, but implementing them in-sheet like Excel. In basic operation, Numbers can be used just like Excel; data can be typed anywhere, and formulas can be created by referring to the data by its cell. However, if the user types a header into the table, something one normally does as a matter of course, Numbers uses this to automatically construct a named range for the cells on that row or column. For instance, if the user types "month" into A1 and then types the names "January", "February", etc. into the cells below it, Numbers constructs a named range for the cells A2 through A13 and gives it the name "month". The same is true when the user types in the figures for "sales" and "income". The user can then write the averaging formula in a category-like text format, = total income / cars sold. The formula will find the appropriate data and calculate the results independent of the row. Like Improv, this formula does not refer to the physical location of the data in the sheet, so the sheet can be dramatically modified without causing the formula to fail.

Similar to Improv, formulas can be represented as icons in Numbers, allowing them to be dragged about the sheets. One noteworthy example of this is a sidebar that contains the sum, average, and other basic calculations for the current selection in the active table. These serve a function similar to the sum that appears at the bottom of the window in Microsoft Excel. However, the user can drag one of the function icons from the sidebar into the sheet to make the calculation appear in that location. In another nod to Improv, the Formula List shows all of the formulas in the spreadsheet in a separate area and allows edits in place or easy navigation to their use in the sheets.

Numbers '09 contains 262 built-in functions that can be used in formulas. This contrasts with Excel 2007's 338 functions. Many of the functions in Numbers are identical to those in Excel; missing ones tend to be related to statistics, although this area was greatly improved in Numbers '09.

Numbers '09 includes a system for categorizing data similar to pivot tables. Pivots were introduced in Improv and were manipulated by dragging the category headers, allowing the user to quickly rotate rows into columns or vice versa. Although Numbers has similar draggable objects representing formulas, they are not used for this feature and direct manipulation is missing. Instead, Numbers places pop-up menus in the column headers allowing the user to collapse multiple rows into totals (sums, averages, etc.) based on data that is common across rows. This is similar functionality to a pivot table but lacks the ease of re-arrangement of the Improv model and other advanced features. Numbers 5.2, released on September 17, 2018, further improves on these features by adding Smart Categories, allowing the user to "quickly organize and summarize tables to gain new insights".

Pivot tables were later added to Numbers 11.2 on September 28, 2021.

=== Layout and display ===
As Numbers uses the canvas as the basis for the document, media is not tied to the tables; one could build a Numbers canvas that contains a collection of photographs but no tables. In typical use, one or more tables are placed on the canvas and sized and styled to show only the data of interest. Charts and labels are commonly positioned around the tables. Other media, like photographs or illustrations, can be added as well.

Like the other products in the iWork suite, Numbers includes a variety of styles and layouts designed by professional illustrators. Opening an Excel sheet in Numbers results in a display with smooth fonts, a clean layout, and color selections. These can then be modified, optionally using one of the supplied templates, and saved out to Excel format again with these styles intact. Numbers also allows sheets to be emailed in Excel format in a single step or shared through Numbers for iCloud.

=== Other features ===
- Table-centric workflow enabling lists to be structured with headers and summaries.
- Checkbox, slider, and pulldown list cells.
- Drag-and-drop of functions from a sidebar into cells.
- A Print Preview which allows editing while previewing.
- Imports from Microsoft Excel. This lacks certain Excel features, including Visual Basic for Applications (also absent in the 2008 version of Office for Mac, although it was reintroduced for the 2011 version) and pivot tables (added in ver 11.2).
- Exports to Microsoft Excel.

== Reception ==
Numbers has been well received in the press, notably for its text-based formulas, clean look, and ease of use. Macworld has given it high marks, especially newer versions, awarding Numbers '09 four mice out of five. They did point out several common issues, especially problems exporting to Excel and the inability to "lock" cells to prevent them from moving when the table is scrolled. Numbers for the iPhone and iPad have received similar favorable reviews.

However, version 3.0 of Numbers created an outpouring of complaints due to the loss of important business features, with the Apple support community showing a 10 to 1 ratio of dissatisfied users with the newer version of Numbers. Versions 4 and 5 of the software put many of these features back and added many new features and functionalities. In their review of Version 5, MacWorld concluded that "Numbers 5 for Mac advances the app, making it more useful for more purposes with less effort, but it’s still a shadow of full-feature business spreadsheet programs."

== Version history ==
Version number	Release date	Changes
1.0	August 7, 2007	Initial release.

== See also ==
- Comparison of spreadsheet software
- Microsoft Excel
- Keynote (presentation software)
- Pages (word processor)
- The Spreadsheet by Randy Wiggington, Apple's first spreadsheet software
