= Comparison of office suites =

The following tables compare general and technical information for a number of office suites:

== General information ==
Platforms listed are for when a local application is available that does not require network connectivity to function.
Office Suite names that are on a light purple background are discontinued.

Name	Developer	Predecessor	Initial release	Platform	Latest release		License	Cost (USD)
Name	Developer	Predecessor	Initial release	Platform	Version	Date	License	Cost (USD)
Ability Office	Ability Plus Software	—	1995	Windows	11	2022-02	Proprietary	39.99 +
Apache OpenOffice	Apache Software Foundation	OpenOffice.org; StarOffice	2012-05	Linux	4.1.17	2026-10-14	Apache-2.0	No cost
Apache OpenOffice	Apache Software Foundation	OpenOffice.org; StarOffice	2012-05	macOS	4.1.17	2026-10-14	Apache-2.0	No cost
Apache OpenOffice	Apache Software Foundation	OpenOffice.org; StarOffice	2012-05	Windows	4.1.17	2026-10-14	Apache-2.0	No cost
Calligra Suite	KDE	KOffice	2011	BSD	26.08.3	2026-11-05	LGPL and GPL	No cost
Calligra Suite	KDE	KOffice	2011	Linux	26.08.3	2026-11-05	LGPL and GPL	No cost
Collabora Online	Collabora	LibreOffice; OpenOffice.org +Go-oo (Note: Go-Open Office); StarOffice	2019 (Note: The app uses LibreOffice kit technology and is based on Collabora Online for which development started in 2013.)	Android	26.04.3.1	2026-09-07	MPL-2.0	No cost, optional subscriptions with support available
Collabora Online	Collabora	LibreOffice; OpenOffice.org +Go-oo; StarOffice	2021 (Note: Version 21.11. Using LibreOffice kit technology, development started in 2013.)	FreeBSD	Build your own	Build your own	MPL-2.0	No cost, optional subscriptions with support available
Collabora Online	Collabora	LibreOffice; OpenOffice.org +Go-oo; StarOffice	2019	ChromeOS	26.04.3.1	2026-09-07	MPL-2.0	No cost, optional subscriptions with support available
Collabora Online	Collabora	LibreOffice; OpenOffice.org +Go-oo; StarOffice	2019	iOS	26.04.3	2026-09-08	MPL-2.0	No cost, optional subscriptions with support available
Collabora Online	Collabora	LibreOffice; OpenOffice.org +Go-oo; StarOffice	2019	iPadOS	26.04.3	2026-09-08	MPL-2.0	No cost, optional subscriptions with support available
Collabora Online	Collabora	LibreOffice; OpenOffice.org +Go-oo; StarOffice	2015 (Note: Version 4.4.)	Linux (Classic Desktop)	26.04	2026-10-02	MPL-2.0	No cost, optional subscriptions with support available
Collabora Online	Collabora	LibreOffice; OpenOffice.org +Go-oo; StarOffice	2025 (Note: Version 25.04)	Linux (New Desktop)	26.04	2026-09-14	MPL-2.0	No cost, optional subscriptions with support available
Collabora Online	Collabora	LibreOffice; OpenOffice.org +Go-oo; StarOffice	2015	macOS (Classic Desktop)	26.04	2026-10-02	MPL-2.0	No cost, optional subscriptions with support available
Collabora Online	Collabora	LibreOffice; OpenOffice.org +Go-oo; StarOffice	2025	macOS (New Desktop)	26.04	2026-09-14	MPL-2.0	No cost, optional subscriptions with support available
Collabora Online	Collabora	LibreOffice; OpenOffice.org +Go-oo; StarOffice	2015	Online CODE (Note: CODE: Collabora Online Development Edition)	26.04.5.1	2026-10-12	MPL-2.0	No cost, optional subscriptions with support available
Collabora Online	Collabora	LibreOffice; OpenOffice.org +Go-oo; StarOffice	2016 (Note: Version 1.0. Using LibreOffice kit technology, development started in 2013.)	Online COOL (Note: COOL: Collabora Online, this is their flagship collaborative online office suite. It is the enterprise-grade, commercially supported version of their product.)	26.04.4.3	2026-10-09	MPL-2.0	No cost, optional subscriptions with support available
Collabora Online	Collabora	LibreOffice; OpenOffice.org +Go-oo; StarOffice	2015	Windows (Classic Desktop)	26.04	2026-10-02	MPL-2.0	No cost, optional subscriptions with support available
Collabora Online	Collabora	LibreOffice; OpenOffice.org +Go-oo; StarOffice	2025	Windows (New Desktop)	26.04	2026-09-14	MPL-2.0	No cost, optional subscriptions with support available
Feng Office Community Edition	Feng Office	—	2007	Online	4.2.1.2	2026-11-03	AGPL-3.0-only	No cost
GNU TeXmacs	Joris van der Hoeven	—	1996?	BSD	2.1.5	2026-03-12	GPL-3.0-or-later	No cost
GNU TeXmacs	Joris van der Hoeven	—	1996?	Linux	2.1.5	2026-03-12	GPL-3.0-or-later	No cost
GNU TeXmacs	Joris van der Hoeven	—	1996?	macOS	2.1.5	2026-03-12	GPL-3.0-or-later	No cost
GNU TeXmacs	Joris van der Hoeven	—	1996?	Unix	2.1.5	2026-03-12	GPL-3.0-or-later	No cost
GNU TeXmacs	Joris van der Hoeven	—	1996?	Windows	2.1.5	2026-03-12	GPL-3.0-or-later	No cost
Google Workspace	Google	G Suite; Google Apps; Writely	2006	Android (Note: Offline editing when used with Chrome or Edge web browser.)	Rolling	Rolling	Proprietary	0 - 60 (Note: 60.00 per account per year. 30 day-trial at no cost. No cost for education and non-profit.)
Google Workspace	Google	G Suite; Google Apps; Writely	2006	ChromeOS (Note: Offline editing when used with Chrome web browser.)	Rolling	Rolling	Proprietary	0 - 60
Google Workspace	Google	G Suite; Google Apps; Writely	2006	iOS	Rolling	Rolling	Proprietary	0 - 60
Google Workspace	Google	G Suite; Google Apps; Writely	2006	Linux	Rolling	Rolling	Proprietary	0 - 60
Google Workspace	Google	G Suite; Google Apps; Writely	2006	macOS	Rolling	Rolling	Proprietary	0 - 60
Google Workspace	Google	G Suite; Google Apps; Writely	2006	Windows	Rolling	Rolling	Proprietary	0 - 60
Hancom Office	Hancom	ThinkFree Office	1998	Android	2020	2020	Proprietary	59.99 - 119.99
Hancom Office	Hancom	ThinkFree Office	1998	iOS	2020	2020	Proprietary	59.99 - 119.99
Hancom Office	Hancom	ThinkFree Office	1998	macOS	2020	2020	Proprietary	59.99 - 119.99
Hancom Office	Hancom	ThinkFree Office	1998	Online	2020	2020	Proprietary	59.99 - 119.99
Hancom Office	Hancom	ThinkFree Office	1998	Windows	2020	2020	Proprietary	59.99 - 119.99
iWork	Apple Inc.	AppleWorks	2005	iOS	14.0	2024-04-02	Proprietary	No cost
iWork	Apple Inc.	AppleWorks	2005	iPadOS	14.0	2024-04-02	Proprietary	No cost
iWork	Apple Inc.	AppleWorks	2005	macOS	14.0	2024-04-02	Proprietary	No cost
iWork	Apple Inc.	AppleWorks	2005	Online	14.0	2024-04-02	Proprietary	No cost
LibreOffice	The Document Foundation	OpenOffice.org +Go-oo (Note: Go-Open Office); StarOffice	2010-09	BSD	26.8.2	2026-10-29	MPL-2.0	No cost
LibreOffice	The Document Foundation	OpenOffice.org +Go-oo; StarOffice	2010-09	Linux	26.8.2	2026-10-29	MPL-2.0	No cost
LibreOffice	The Document Foundation	OpenOffice.org +Go-oo; StarOffice	2010-09	macOS	26.8.2	2026-10-29	MPL-2.0	No cost
LibreOffice	The Document Foundation	OpenOffice.org +Go-oo; StarOffice	2010-09	~~Solaris/Illumos~~	26.8.2	2026-10-29	MPL-2.0	No cost
LibreOffice	The Document Foundation	OpenOffice.org +Go-oo; StarOffice	2010-09	Unix	26.8.2	2026-10-29	MPL-2.0	No cost
LibreOffice	The Document Foundation	OpenOffice.org +Go-oo; StarOffice	2010-09	Windows	26.8.2	2026-10-29	MPL-2.0	No cost
Microsoft 365	Microsoft	Forethought, Inc.	2015	Android	rolling	2024	Proprietary	89.95 - 679.95
Microsoft 365	Microsoft	Forethought, Inc.	2013	iOS	rolling	2024	Proprietary	89.95 - 679.95
Microsoft 365	Microsoft	Forethought, Inc.	1990	macOS	2021	2021	Proprietary	89.95 - 679.95
Microsoft 365	Microsoft	Forethought, Inc.	2011	online	rolling	2024	Proprietary	89.95 - 679.95
Microsoft 365	Microsoft	Forethought, Inc.	1992	Windows	2021	2021	Proprietary	89.95 - 679.95
NeoOffice (discontinued)	Planamesa Software	OpenOffice.org; LibreOffice; StarOffice	2005-06-02	macOS	2022.7	2023-09-04	GPL	Discontinued
OfficeSuite	MobiSystems	—	2004	Android	16.5.60515	2026-07-28	Proprietary	0 - 29.99 (Note: €29.99/year for all platforms. No cost with ads and limited support.)
OfficeSuite	MobiSystems	—	2004	ChromeOS	16.5.60515	2026-07-28	Proprietary	0 - 29.99
OfficeSuite	MobiSystems	—	2004	iOS			Proprietary	0 - 29.99
OfficeSuite	MobiSystems	—	2004	macOS	3.0.2	2026-05-29	Proprietary	0 - 29.99
OfficeSuite	MobiSystems	—	2004	Windows	11.50.16587.0	2026-07-31	Proprietary	0 - 29.99
OnlyOffice	Ascensio Systems	Teamlab	2010	Android	10.0	2026-10-10	AGPL	0 - 75-7,200 (Note: 75-7,200 per year for commercial use. No cost for non-commercial use, mobile apps are not available with community edition.)
OnlyOffice	Ascensio Systems	Teamlab	2010	iOS	10.0	2026-10-10	AGPL	0 - 75-7,200
OnlyOffice	Ascensio Systems	Teamlab	2010	Linux	10.0	2026-10-10	AGPL	0 - 75-7,200
OnlyOffice	Ascensio Systems	Teamlab	2010	macOS	10.0	2026-10-10	AGPL	0 - 75-7,200
OnlyOffice	Ascensio Systems	Teamlab	2010	Online	10.0	2026-10-10	AGPL	0 - 75-7,200
OnlyOffice	Ascensio Systems	Teamlab	2010	Windows	10.0	2026-10-10	AGPL	0 - 75-7,200
Polaris Office	Infraware Inc.	—	2011-05	Android	9.6.3	2021-12-23	Proprietary	?
Polaris Office	Infraware Inc.	—	2011-05	iOS	9.6.4	2021-12-29	Proprietary	?
Polaris Office	Infraware Inc.	—	2011-05	macOS	9.0.30	2021-12-03	Proprietary	?
Polaris Office	Infraware Inc.	—	2011-05	Windows	9.113.79	2021-12-28	Proprietary	?
SoftMaker Office	SoftMaker	—	2012-08	Android	2024 rev 1224	2025-03-18	Proprietary	29.90 - 129.95 (Note: 29.90 yearly sub for Office NX Home, 49.90 yearly sub for Office NX Universal, 99.95 to purchase Office Standard, 129.95 to purchase Office Professional. Free trial available for 30 days.)
SoftMaker Office	SoftMaker	—	2020-12	ChromeOS	2024 rev 1224	2025-03-18	Proprietary	29.90 - 129.95
SoftMaker Office	SoftMaker	—	2022-08	iOS	2024 rev 1224	2025-03-18	Proprietary	29.90 - 129.95
SoftMaker Office	SoftMaker	—	2006-12	Linux	2024 rev 1224	2025-03-18	Proprietary	29.90 - 129.95
SoftMaker Office	SoftMaker	—	2018-03	macOS	2024 rev 1224	2025-03-18	Proprietary	29.90 - 129.95
SoftMaker Office	SoftMaker	—	1995-12	Windows	2024 rev 1224	2025-03-18	Proprietary	29.90 - 129.95
Tiki Wiki CMS Groupware	Tiki Association (Note: Tiki Software Community Association.)	—	2002	Online	27.1	2024-11-23	LGPL-2.1-only	No cost
WordPerfect Office	Corel	WordPerfect (1982)	1991	Windows	2021	2021-05	Proprietary	69.99 - 399.99
WPS Office	Kingsoft	Kingsoft Office	1988	Android	PC 11.2.0	2019-04	Proprietary	0 - 119.99 (Note: $119.99 perpetual license. $29.99 annual subscription. No cost with ads.)
WPS Office	Kingsoft	Kingsoft Office	1988	Linux	PC 11.2.0	2019-04	Proprietary	0 - 119.99
WPS Office	Kingsoft	Kingsoft Office	1988	iOS	PC 11.2.0	2019-04	Proprietary	0 - 119.99
WPS Office	Kingsoft	Kingsoft Office	1988	macOS	PC 11.2.0	2019-04	Proprietary	0 - 119.99
WPS Office	Kingsoft	Kingsoft Office	1988	Windows	PC 11.2.0	2019-04	Proprietary	0 - 119.99
Zimbra	Synacor	—	2005	Online	Rolling	Rolling	Proprietary	0 - ? optional options that cost (Note: free community edition, other paid for versions with increasing features.ׁׂׂ)
Zoho Workplace	Zoho Corp.	Zoho Office Suite	2005	Online; Android; ChromeOS iOS macOS; Windows	Rolling	Rolling	Proprietary	$1-$6
Name	Developer	Predecessor	Initial release	Platform	Latest release		License	Cost (USD)
Name	Developer	Predecessor	Initial release	Platform	Version	Date	License	Cost (USD)

=== OS support ===
The operating systems the office suites were designed to run on without emulation; for the given office suite/OS combination, there are five possibilities:

- No indicates that it does not exist or was never released.
- Partial indicates that the office suite lacks important functionality and it is still being developed, or it is online only so requires network connectivity to function.
- Beta indicates that while a version of the office suite is fully functional and has been released, it is still in development (e.g. for stability).
- Yes indicates that the office suite has been officially released in a fully functional, stable version.
- Dropped indicates that while the office suite works, new versions are no longer being released for the indicated OS; the number in parentheses is the last known stable version which was officially released for that OS.

Office Suite names that are on a light purple background are discontinued.

Name	Android	BSD	ChromeOS	iOS	iPadOS	Linux	macOS	Unix	Windows
Ability Office	No	No	No	No	No	No	No	No	Yes
Apache OpenOffice	No	No	No	No	No	Yes	Yes	No	Yes
Calligra Suite	No	Yes	No	No	No	Yes	No	No	No
Collabora Online	Yes	Yes (Note: Online or Build your own application from source code)	Yes	Yes	Yes	Yes	Yes	Yes	Yes
Feng Office Community Edition	No	Partial (Note: Online only requiring network connectivity to function)	No	No	No	Partial	Partial	Partial	Partial
GNU TeXmacs	No	Yes	No	No	No	Yes	Yes	Yes	Yes
Google Workspace	Yes (Note: Offline and Online)	No	Yes	Yes	Yes	Yes	Yes	No	Yes
Hancom Office	Yes	Partial (Note: Online only (iCloud) requiring Internet connectivity to function)	Yes	Yes	No	Partial	Yes	Partial	Yes
iWork	No	Partial	No	Yes	Yes	Partial	Yes	Partial	Partial
LibreOffice	Yes	Yes	No	No	No	Yes	Yes	Yes	Yes
Microsoft 365	Yes	No	Partial (Note: Online only (Microsoft 365) requiring Internet connectivity to function)	Yes	Yes	No	Partial (Note: Not all features available, e.g. Project, Visio, Access.)	No	Yes
NeoOffice (discontinued)	No	No	No	No	No	No	Yes	No	No
OfficeSuite	Yes	No	Yes	Yes	No	No	Yes	No	Yes
OnlyOffice	Yes	Partial	Yes	Yes	No (Note: not stated if supported.)	Yes	Yes	Partial	Yes
Polaris Office	Yes	Partial	Yes	Yes	No	Yes	Yes	Partial	Yes
SoftMaker Office	Yes	Dropped (Note: Dropped 2006.)	Yes	Yes	No	Yes	Yes	No	Yes
Tiki Wiki CMS Groupware	No	Partial	No	No	No	Partial	Partial	Partial	Partial
WordPerfect Office	No	No	No	No	No	Some (Note: Version 2000.)	No	No	Yes
WPS Office	Yes	No	Yes	Yes	Yes	Yes	Yes	No	Yes
Zimbra	Partial	Partial	Partial	Partial	Partial	Partial	Partial	Partial	Partial
Zoho Workplace	Yes	Partial	Partial	Yes	Yes	Yes	Yes	Partial	Yes
Name	Android	BSD	ChromeOS	iOS	iPadOS	Linux	macOS	Unix	Windows

=== Supported file formats ===
Office Suite names that are on a light purple background are discontinued.

Name	Legacy Microsoft Office (.doc,.xls...) (Note: Microsoft's binary file formats for Office 97-2003)	OpenDocument (.odt,.ods...) ISO/IEC 26300 (Note: An open file format for word processing documents, spreadsheets, presentations and graphics)	Strict Office Open XML (.docx,.xlsx...) ISO/IEC 29500 strict (Note: A file format created by Microsoft for word processing documents, spreadsheets, presentations and graphics)	Microsoft XML (.docx,.xlsx...) (Note: Microsoft's default file formats for Office 2007 and above)	Portable Document Format (.pdf) ISO 32000 (Note: A partially open file format to present documents, including text formatting and images. It includes proprietary technologies defined only by Adobe that are not standardized and whose specifications are published only on Adobe's website, many of these are not supported by popular third-party implementations of PDF.)
Ability Office	Yes	Yes	No	Yes	Export
Apache OpenOffice	Yes	Native format	No	Import	Yes with plugin
Calligra Suite	Import	Native format	No	Import	Export (Note: Not included in this office suite, but provided in the Desktop Environment.)
Collabora Online	Yes	Native format	Yes (Note: Supported in Desktop apps (Windows, Mac and Linux), Import only for Android, iOS, ChromeOS and Online.)	Yes	Yes
Feng Office Community Edition	No	No	No	No	No
GNU TeXmacs	No	No	No	No	Export
Google Workspace	Yes	Yes	No	Yes	Yes
Hancom Office	Yes	Yes	No	Yes	Yes
iWork	Yes	No	No	Import	Export
LibreOffice	Yes	Native format	Yes	Yes	Yes
Microsoft 365	Partial (Note: Not supported in Online version.)	Partial (Note: Not supported in macOS.)	Partial (Note: Not supported in Excel for macOS or iPad.)	Native format	Yes
NeoOffice (discontinued)	Yes	Native format	No	Yes	Import with plugin
OfficeSuite	Yes	Partial (Note: OpenDocument text documents only.)	No	Yes	Yes
OnlyOffice	Yes	Yes	Yes	Native format	Yes
Polaris Office	Yes	Yes	No	Yes	Viewing
SoftMaker Office	Yes	Partial (Note: Read/write: text documents, read: spreadsheets, presentations.)	No	Yes	Yes
Tiki Wiki CMS Groupware	search	search	No	search	Export and search
WordPerfect Office	Yes	Yes	Yes	Yes	Some versions
WPS Office	Yes	Yes with add-in	No	Yes	Export in all versions. Import with subscription only.
Zimbra	Yes	Native format	Yes	Yes	Yes
Zoho Workplace	Yes	Yes	Yes	Yes	Yes
Name	Legacy Microsoft Office (.doc,.xls...)	OpenDocument (.odt,.ods...) ISO/IEC 26300	Strict Office Open XML (.docx,.xlsx...) ISO/IEC 29500 strict	Microsoft XML (.docx,.xlsx...)	Portable Document Format (.pdf) ISO 32000

== Main components ==
Office Suite names that are on a light purple background are discontinued.

Name	Word processing Software	Spreadsheet Software	Presentation Software	Notetaking software	Diagramming software	Raster graphics editor	Vector graphics editor	Image viewer	Formula editor	Database management software	Project management software	Desktop publishing software	Communication	Calendaring software	File hosting service
Ability Office	Ability Write	Ability Spreadsheet	Ability Presentation	No	Ability Draw	Ability Photopaint	Ability Draw	Ability Photoalbum	No	Ability Database	No	No	No	No	No
Apache OpenOffice	OpenOffice Writer	OpenOffice Calc	OpenOffice Impress	No	OpenOffice Draw	No	OpenOffice Draw	No	OpenOffice Math	OpenOffice Base	Partial (Note: Import/Export with ProjectLibre and others.)	OpenOffice Draw	No	No	No
Calligra Suite	Calligra Words	Calligra Sheets	Calligra Stage	Braindump	Calligra Flow	Krita	Karbon	Gwenview / Digikam	KFormula	Kexi	Calligra Plan	Calligra Words	No	No	No
Collabora Online	Writer	Calc	Impress	Partial (Note: Available in integrations, such as Nextcloud, ownCloud, others.)	Yes	Yes	Yes	Yes	Yes	No	Partial	Draw	Partial	Partial	Partial
Feng Office Community Edition	Yes	No	Yes	Yes	No	No	No	Yes	No	No	Yes	No	No	No	No
GNU TeXmacs	Yes	Yes	Yes	No	No	No	Yes	No	Yes (Note: High quality maths typesetting.)	No	No	under development	No	No	No
Google Workspace	Google Docs	Google Sheets	Google Slides	Google Keep	Google Drawings	Google Drawings	Google Drawings	Google Photos	Google Docs	No	No	Google Slides	Google Chat/Meet	Google Calendar	Google Drive
Hancom Office	Hwp	Cell	Show	No	No	No	No	No	No	No	No	No	No	No	No
iWork	Pages	Numbers	Keynote	Notes	No	No	No	Apple Photos (Note: Apple Photos is included in the operating system)	Yes	No	No	Pages	No	No	iCloud
LibreOffice	LibreOffice Writer	LibreOffice Calc	LibreOffice Impress	No	LibreOffice Draw	LibreOffice Draw	LibreOffice Draw	LibreOffice Draw	LibreOffice Math	LibreOffice Base	Partial	LibreOffice Writer and LibreOffice Draw (Note: LibreOffice Writer and Draw contain desktop publishing features, but feature sets are not equal for both components. Although Draw can import Microsoft Publisher files, it has problems of creating complex editorial projects. For example, alternate glyphs in fonts cannot be used automatically. Official tech support recommended Scribus for desktop publishing tasks.)	No	No	No
Microsoft 365	Microsoft Word	Microsoft Excel	Microsoft PowerPoint	Microsoft OneNote	Microsoft Visio (Note: A lightweight, web-based version of Visio is available to Microsoft 365 business subscribers. Full Visio is available to organizations as a separate purchase from Office.)	No	Partial (Note: Vector graphics can be made in Microsoft PowerPoint.)	No	Yes (Note: An equation editor is available in Microsoft Word, Microsoft PowerPoint, Microsoft Excel, and Microsoft OneNote.)	Microsoft Access (Note: Professional and Professional Plus.)	Microsoft Project (Note: Separate product purchase required.)	Microsoft Publisher (Note: Standard, Professional and Professional Plus.)	Microsoft Teams	Microsoft Outlook	OneDrive
NeoOffice (discontinued)	NeoOffice Writer	NeoOffice Calc	NeoOffice Impress	No	NeoOffice Draw	No	NeoOffice Draw	No	NeoOffice Math	NeoOffice Base	No	NeoOffice Draw	No	No	No
OfficeSuite	Word Module	Spreadsheet Module	Presentation Module	No	No	No	No	No	No	No	No	No	No	No	No
OnlyOffice	Yes	Yes	Yes	No	No	No	No	No	No	No	No	No	No	No	No
SoftMaker Office	Textmaker	PlanMaker	Presentations	No	No	No	No	No	Yes	DataMaker (Note: Discontinued as of 1999.)	No	Yes	No	No	No
Tiki Wiki CMS Groupware	Tiki Wiki	Tiki Spreadsheet	Tiki Slideshow with S5 format	Tiki Notepad	Tiki Draw via SVG-edit	Tiki Draw via SVG-edit	Tiki Draw via SVG-edit	Tiki File Gallery	No	Tiki Trackers	Tiki Trackers, Tiki Wiki and Tiki Task	No	No	No	No
WordPerfect Office	WordPerfect	Quattro Pro	Corel Presentations	WordPerfect Lightning	Corel Presentations	Corel Paint Shop Pro	Corel Draw	No	Equation Editor	Paradox (Note: In Professional version only.)	Yes	Yes	No	No	No
WPS Office	WPS Writer	WPS Spreadsheets	WPS Presentation	No	No	No	No	No	Equation Editor (Note: Currently unavailable for Linux.)	No	No	No	No	No	No
Zimbra	Yes	Yes	Yes	Yes	No	No	No	No	No	No	No	No	Yes	Yes	Yes
Zoho Workplace	Zoho Writer	Zoho Sheet	Zoho Show	Zoho Notebook	Vani by Zoho	No	No	No	Yes (Note: Formula editing is avilable while you edit documents in Zoho Writer)	Zoho Analytics	Zoho Projects	No	Zoho Cliq	Zoho Calendar	Zoho WorkDrive
Name	Word processing Software	Spreadsheet Software	Presentation Software	Notetaking software	Diagramming software	Raster graphics editor	Vector graphics editor	Image viewer	Formula editor	Database management software	Project management software	Desktop publishing software	Communication	Calendaring software	File hosting service

=== Online capabilities ===
Office Suite names that are on a light purple background are discontinued.

Name	E-mail client	HTML editor	Collaborative software	Online editing
Ability Office	No	export	No	No
Apache OpenOffice	No	OpenOffice Writer (Note: When in WYSIWYG HTML editing mode.)	No	With plugins
Calligra Suite	Kontact	Kate Quanta+	No	No
Collabora Online	Partial	Yes	Yes	Yes
Feng Office Community Edition	No	No	Yes	Yes
GNU TeXmacs	allows to read emails	Yes	under development	No
Google Workspace	Gmail	Google Sites	Yes	Yes
Hancom Office	No	Note	No	Yes
iWork	Apple Mail	No	Yes	iCloud
LibreOffice	No (Note: Can interface with email clients and Mail Merge Wizard can send email directly from LibreOffice.)	LibreOffice Writer	LibreOffice Calc	Plugins (Note: LibreOffice Online under development.)
Microsoft 365	Microsoft Outlook (Note: Not included in Microsoft Office 2013 or 2016 Home & Student.)	Microsoft SharePoint Designer. Microsoft FrontPage (Note: Versions after Office 2000 Premium and Developer contain Microsoft FrontPage, the full-blown web page editor.); Microsoft Word (Note: Microsoft Word can read and write HTML starting with a special upgrade for Word 6.0.)	Microsoft SharePoint (Note: Available for separate subscription.)	Office 365
NeoOffice (discontinued)	No	NeoOffice Writer	No	No
OfficeSuite	OfficeSuite Mail for Windows. AquaMail for Android.	No	No	No
OnlyOffice	Yes	No	Yes	Online
SoftMaker Office	No	No	No	No
Tiki Wiki CMS Groupware	Tiki Webmail	WYSIWYG editor via CKEditor	Yes	Online
WordPerfect Office	has mail merge capabilities	No	No	Yes
WPS Office	available in Android	Yes	Yes	Yes
Zimbra	Yes	No	Yes	Yes
Zoho Workplace	Zoho Mail	Zoho Writer	Zoho WorkDrive	Zoho WorkDrive
Name	E-mail client	HTML editor	Collaborative software	Online editing

== See also ==
- List of office suites
- Comparison of word processors
- Comparison of presentation programs
- Comparison of spreadsheet software
