= MobiSystems =

Software development company (2001-)

Mobile Systems Ltd.
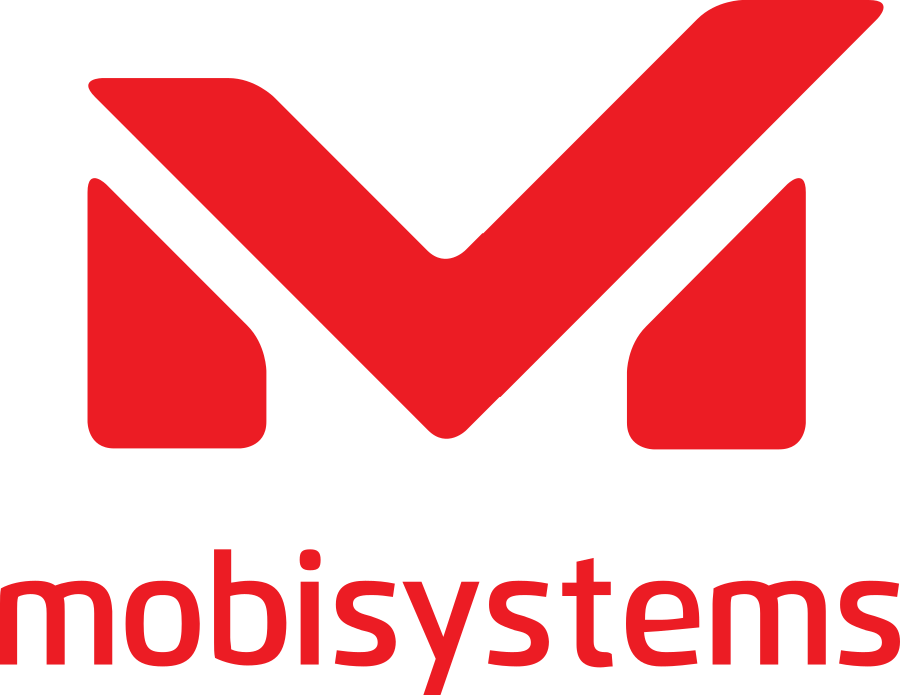

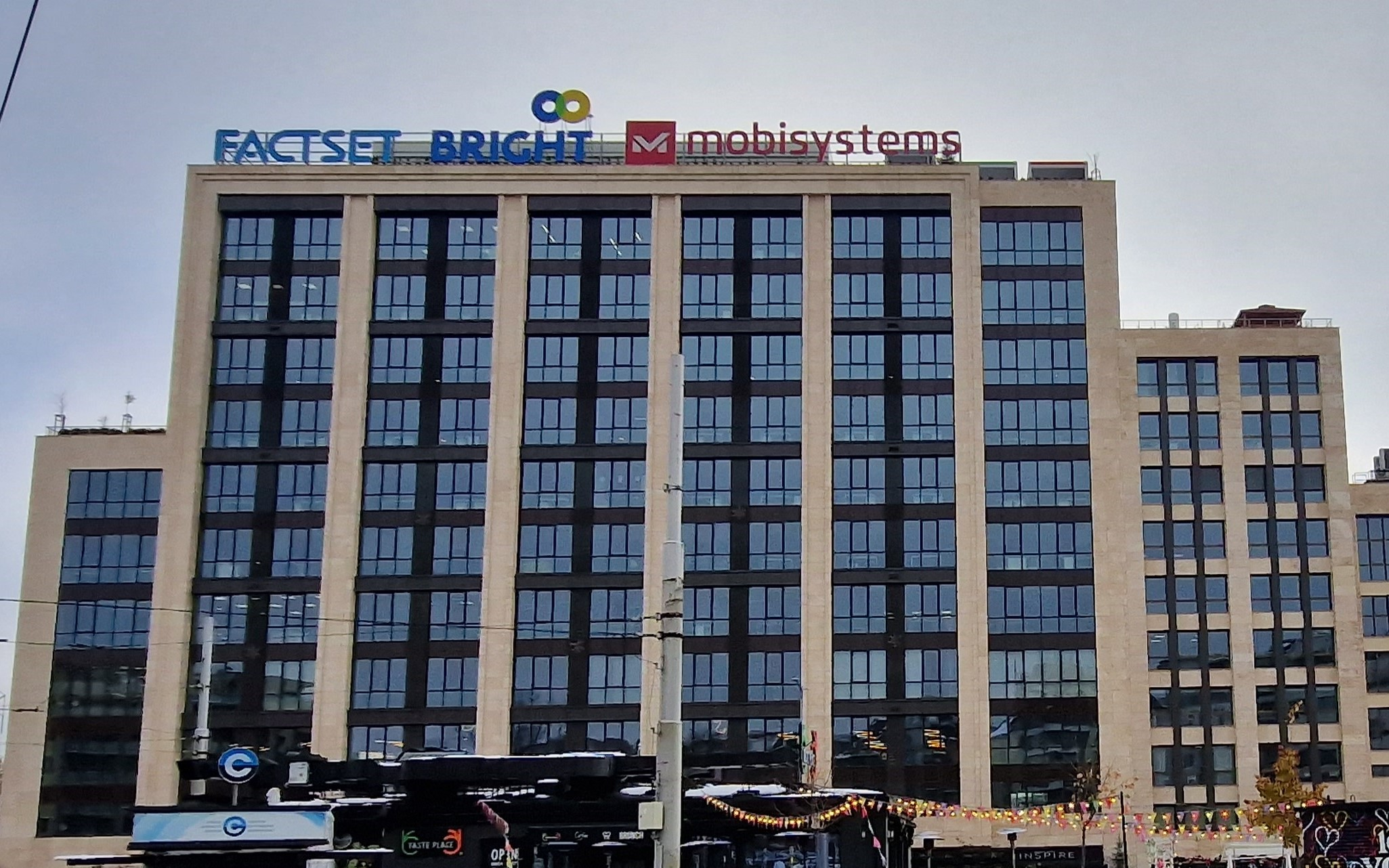
- Mobi Art Building, MobiSystems headquarters in Sofia
- Industry: Computer software
- Founded: 2001; 25 years ago
- Founders: Stanislav Minchev; Dimitar Mitev; Stoyan Gogov; Nikolay Kussovski
- Headquarters: Sofia, Bulgaria
- Area served: Worldwide
- Products: MobiOffice, MobiPDF, Oxford Dictionary apps
- Services: Productivity software, online dictionaries
- Website: mobisystems.com

Mobile Systems Ltd., also known as MobiSystems, is a Bulgarian multinational software development company specializing in productivity software for Android, iOS, Microsoft Windows and Mac operating systems. The company’s products have been installed over 300 million times by users in 195 countries.

Founded in 2001 in Sofia, Bulgaria, the company is privately held and its flagship products include MobiOffice, MobiPDF, as well as multiple dictionary apps using licensed content from Oxford University Press. In 2014, the company was listed as one of the ‘5000 Fastest-Growing Companies in America’ by Inc. magazine.

MobiSystems is a member of the Bulgarian-Romanian Chamber of Commerce and Industry and the Bulgarian Australian Business Council.

== History ==
MobiSystems was founded in 2001 in Sofia, Bulgaria by Stanislav Minchev and Dimitar Mitev.

In 2003, Nikolay Kussovski and Stoyan Gogov joined the company as founding members. As a result, MobiSystems opened an office in San Diego, US. The same year, MobiSystems reached a licensing agreement with Oxford University Press for the development of dictionary apps using language content from Oxford University Press.

In 2004, MobiSystems released the first version of its OfficeSuite office pack, initially for Palm OS, followed by a version for the Symbian mobile operating system in 2005.

In 2009, the company reached an agreement with Sony for the development of Android versions of MobiSystems’ OfficeSuite and File Commander apps, and their preload to Sony’s Xperia series of smartphones and tablets.

In 2013, MobiSystems released the first version of OfficeSuite for iOS devices.

In 2016, the company launched a desktop version of OfficeSuite for Microsoft Windows, making it their debut product for computers.

== Products ==
- MobiOffice - Cross-platform software suite available for Android, iOS, Microsoft Windows and Mac operating systems. OfficeSuite has been installed over 300 million times and includes a word processor (MobiDocs), spreadsheet editor (MobiSheets) and a presentation program (MobiSlides).
- MobiPDF - PDF editor, reader, and converter available for Android, iOS, and Microsoft Windows operating systems.
- Oxford Dictionary - Dictionary app containing (as at July 2026) two monolingual (British and American) and 13 bilingual Oxford University Press dictionaries. The British and American monolingual dictionaries each have a thesauruses included in the dictionary module. MobiSystems develops the app under a licensing agreement with Oxford University Press.
- MobiDrive - Cross-platform cloud storage service available for Android, iOS, and Microsoft Windows.
- File Commander - File manager app available for Android. File Commander has been preloaded onto Sony’s Xperia series devices.

== Awards ==
In 2018, MobiSystems’ OfficeSuite was selected as an Android Excellence app by Google Play.

In 2019, MobiSystems’ OfficeSuite was awarded the Best Mobile App of 2019 award by Best Mobile App Awards.

MobiSystems has won multiple awards from the Bulgarian Association of Information Technologies’ yearly BAIT Awards. In 2016, the company won the ‘Mobile Application’ award for their Oxford Dictionary application. In 2018, Eva Maydell MEP awarded MobiSystems the ‘Company with the largest contribution to promoting the image of the Bulgarian ICT industry worldwide’ award, as well as the ‘Successful Bulgarian ICT Product’ award for OfficeSuite.

== Philanthropy ==
In 2015, MobiSystems began offering free courses for competitive programming, applied programming, and programming for mobile applications to 5-12th grade high school students at ‘First Private Mathematic High School’ in Sofia, Bulgaria.

In 2020, during the COVID-19 pandemic, MobiSystems participated in the Italian Ministry for Technological Innovation & Digitization’s Digital Solidarity (Solidarietà Digitale) initiative by donating licenses for OfficeSuite, PDF Extra, as well as providing cloud storage via their MobiDrive cloud service. The Digital Solidarity initiative was created with the aim to digitize Italian businesses in an effort to mitigate difficulties imposed by the health emergency.

During the same period, MobiSystems donated BGN 100,000 to Aleksandrovska University Hospital in Sofia, Bulgaria for the purchase of ventilators and medical supplies.

In 2023, MobiSystems became a member of the charity organization unconnected.org. The organization’s goal is to provide students, refugees, women, and underserved communities internet access.

== Controversy ==
In 2016 the app version of the American Heritage Dictionary developed by MobiSystems, under license from Houghton Mifflin Harcourt, was criticized by visually impaired users for the dictionary’s lack of VoiceOver accessibility options.
