= Calligra Stage =

Presentation program for KDE desktop environment

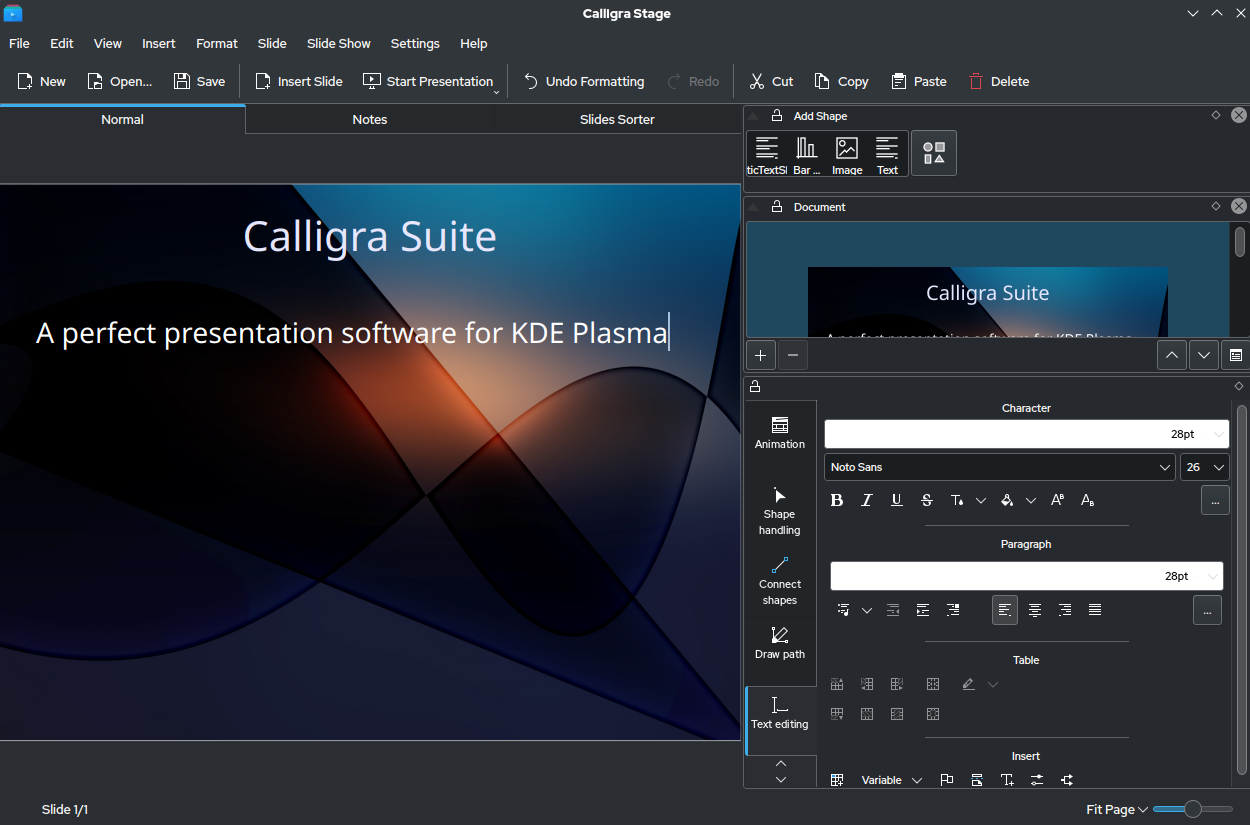
- Calligra Stage 3.2.1
- Developer: KDE
- Operating system: Unix-like, Windows
- Type: Presentation Program
- License: GNU Lesser General Public License
- Website: calligra.org/stage/

Calligra Stage (formerly KPresenter) is a free presentation program that is part of the Calligra Suite, an integrated office suite developed by KDE.

Calligra Stage's native export format is OpenDocument. Stage is able to load presentation documents from Microsoft PowerPoint, LibreOffice Impress and OpenOffice Impress.

In 2014, development of Calligra Gemini with official support for Windows was announced.

== History ==
=== As KPresenter ===
Reginald Stadlbauer began development of KPresenter in 1997. The first official release of the KOffice suite was on October 23, 2000 when it was released as part of K Desktop Environment 2.0. Versions 1.1 followed in 2001, 1.2 in 2002, 1.3 in 2004, 1.4 in 2005, and 1.5 and 1.6 both in 2006.

KOffice underwent a major transition as part of the release of KDE Software Compilation 4 (SC4). Coinciding with the work on SC4, the KOffice team prepared a major new release – KOffice 2.0 – which used the new KDE Platform 4 libraries. Although version 2.0 was released in 2009, the release was labeled as a “platform release” which was recommended only for testers and developers, rather than production use, since the release was missing key features and applications from the previous stable release series.

This continued with version 2.1 in November, 2009. Regular end-users requiring a stable environment were still recommended by developers to use the stable 1.6 release series. This version was also ported to Haiku but the port was later not updated for newer KOffice versions.

In May 2010, version 2.2.0 was released and brought many new features and bugfixes. Kexi was integrated again. Kivio has not yet been migrated. A new framework for effects on shapes and a new import filters for the Microsoft Office Open XML formats that are used in MS Office 2007 and later got added.

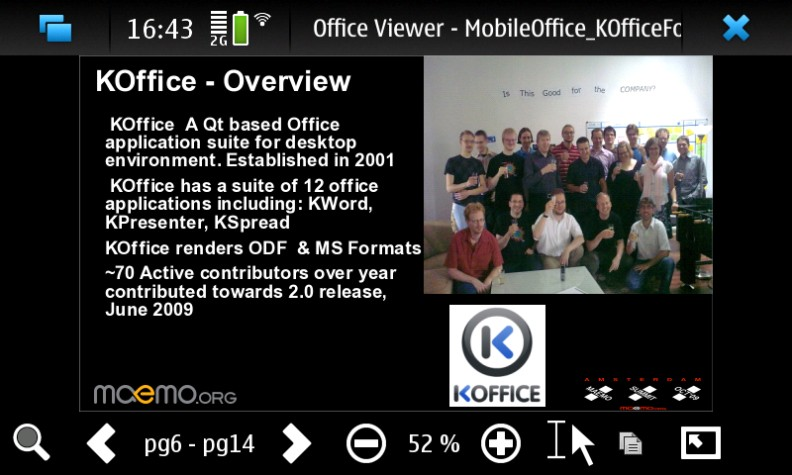
The viewer for smartphones was dropped from KOffice

In mid-2010, following disagreements between KWord’s maintainer Thomas Zander and the other core developers, KPresenter was renamed Calligra Stage. The KWord maintainer forked the KPresenter presentation tool to create KOffice Showcase.

KOffice 2.3, released 31 December 2010, along with subsequent bugfix releases (2.3.1–2.3.3) was still a collaborative effort of both the KOffice and Calligra development teams.

KOffice Showcase 2.4 never materialized in release form. As of 2014 KOffice was declared unmaintained by KDE.

=== As Calligra Stage ===
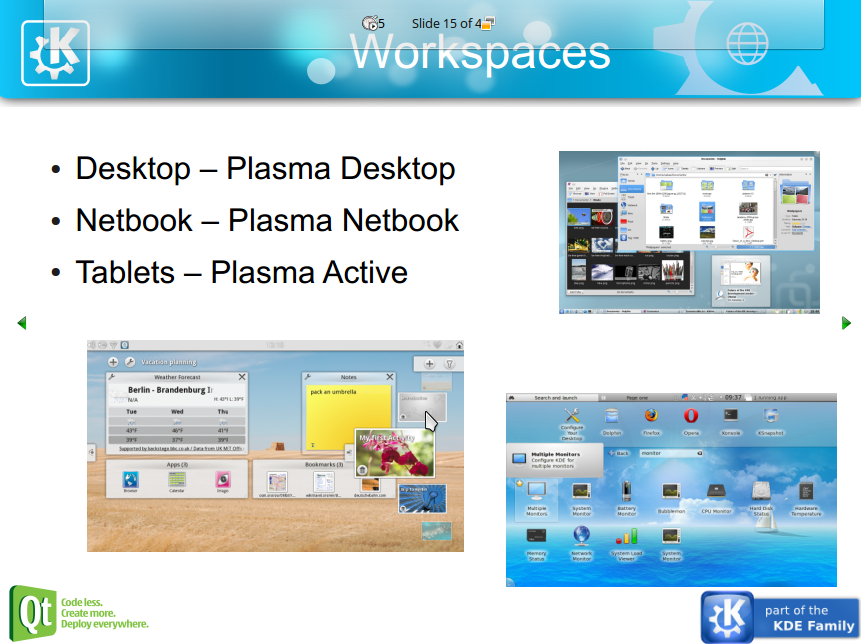
Calligra Active 2.5 displaying a presentation

On 18 May 2011 the Calligra team began releasing monthly snapshots while preparing for the release of Calligra 2.4.

The first version of the Calligra Suite for Windows was released on 21 December 2011. The package is labeled as “highly experimental” and “not yet suitable for daily use”.

The Calligra team originally scheduled to release the final 2.4 version in January 2012 but problems in the undo/redo feature of Words and Stage required a partial rewrite and caused a delay. Calligra 2.4 was released on 11 April 2012.

Calligra 2.4 launched with two mobile-oriented user interfaces: Calligra Mobile and Calligra Active. Calligra Mobile's development was initiated in summer 2009 and first shown during Akademy / Desktop Summit 2009 by KO GmbH as a simple port of KOffice to Maemo. Later Nokia hired KO to assist them with a full-fledged mobile version, including a touchscreen-friendly user interface which was presented by Nokia during Maemo Conference in October 2009. The first alpha version was made available in January 2010. Along with the launch of the Nokia N9 smartphone, Nokia released its own Poppler and Calligra-based office document viewer under GPL.

Calligra Active was launched in 2011 after the Plasma Active initiative to provide a document viewer similar to Calligra Mobile but for tablet computers.

Jolla continued Nokia's efforts on a smartphone version. In 2013 Jolla launched Sailfish Office. Sailfish Office reuses the Qt Quick components from Calligra Active.

In September 2013 a merger of Krita and Krita Sketch, named Krita Gemini, was launched on Windows 8.1. Development was funded by Intel to promote 2in1 convertible notebooks.

In April 2014 Intel and KO GmbH extended the promotion deal to Gemini versions of Stage and Words. On 28 August 2014 the first snapshot of Calligra Gemini was released by KO GmbH for Windows. On 21 November 2014 KDE announced that Calligra Gemini would officially be released as part of Calligra 2.9. As with Krita, this Gemini release adds a touchscreen interface to Words and Stage and users can switch between desktop and touch mode at runtime. Calligra Gemini is a continuation of Calligra Active and Sailfish Office developments but with added editing capabilities. On 19 October 2014 a Linux version was presented.
