= KOffice =

Former office suite for the KDE Desktop Environment

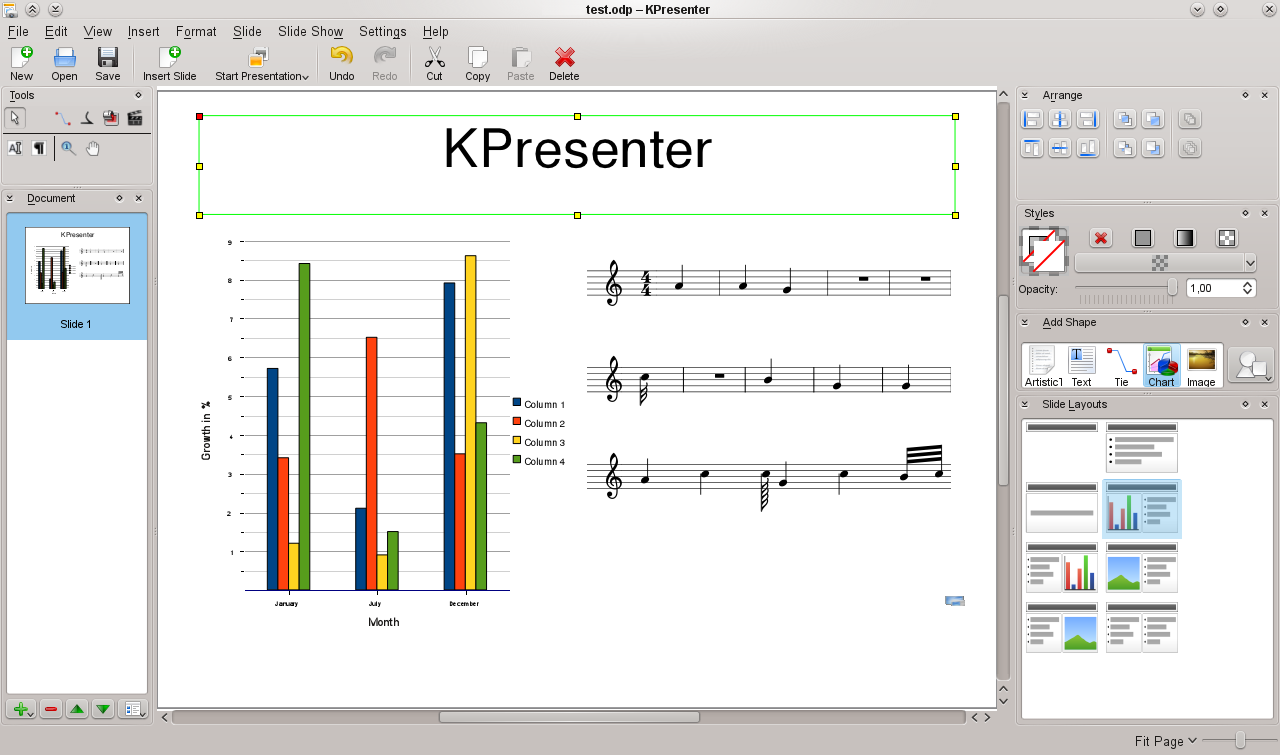
- KPresenter 2.3 screenshot
- Original authors: KDE, Reginald Stadlbauer
- Developers: KDE, Thomas Zander (maintainer)
- Initial release: 23 October 2000; 25 years ago
- Final release: 2.3.3 / 23 February 2011
- Written in: C++
- Operating system: Unix-like, Windows
- Platform: Qt, KDE Platform
- Size: 72.2 MiB (compressed source code)
- Available in: 27 languages
- Type: Office suite
- License: GPL, LGPL
- Website: koffice.org (Redirects to calligra.org)
- Repository: mirror.git.trinitydesktop.org/cgit/koffice/

KOffice was a free and open source office and graphics suite developed by KDE for Unix-like and Windows systems. KOffice contains a word processor (KWord), a spreadsheet (KSpread), a presentation program (KPresenter), and a number of other components that varied over the course of its development.

KOffice was superseded by Calligra Suite in KDE. The KDE3 version is maintained by the Trinity Desktop project.

After development began in 1997, two major stable releases of KOffice were published: Version 1.0 in 2000 and 2.0 in 2009. Following internal conflicts, the majority of KOffice developers split off in 2010 – resulting in the creation of Calligra Suite. Two years later, in September 2012, the KOffice.org website went offline. It now redirects to Calligra.org.

== History ==
Development Sprints
Year	Venue	Date	Ref.
2000	Erlangen, Germany	Sep. 23–25	
2007	Berlin, Germany	Oct. 26–28	
2008	Berlin, Germany	Nov. 7–9	
2009	Berlin, Germany	Jun. 5–7	
2009	Oslo, Norway	Nov. 27–29	
2010	Essen, Germany	Jun. 11–13	

=== First generation ===
Initial work on KOffice development began in 1997, by Reginald Stadlbauer with KPresenter, followed by KWord in 1998.

In 1999, KOffice was cited in testimony in the United States v. Microsoft antitrust trial by then-Microsoft executive Paul Maritz as evidence of competition in the operating system and office suite arena.

The first official release of the KOffice suite was on 23 October 2000, when it was released as part of K Desktop Environment 2.0. Version 1.1 followed in 2001, 1.2 in 2002, 1.3 in 2004, 1.4 in 2005, and 1.5 and 1.6 both in 2006.

=== Second generation ===
KOffice underwent a major transition as part of the release of KDE Software Compilation 4 (SC4). Coinciding with the work on SC4, the KOffice team prepared a major new release – KOffice 2.0 – which used the new KDE Platform 4 libraries. Although version 2.0 was released in 2009, the release was labeled as a “platform release” which was recommended only for testers and developers, rather than production use, since the release was missing key features and applications from the previous stable release series – Kexi, Kivio, and Kugar were not included.

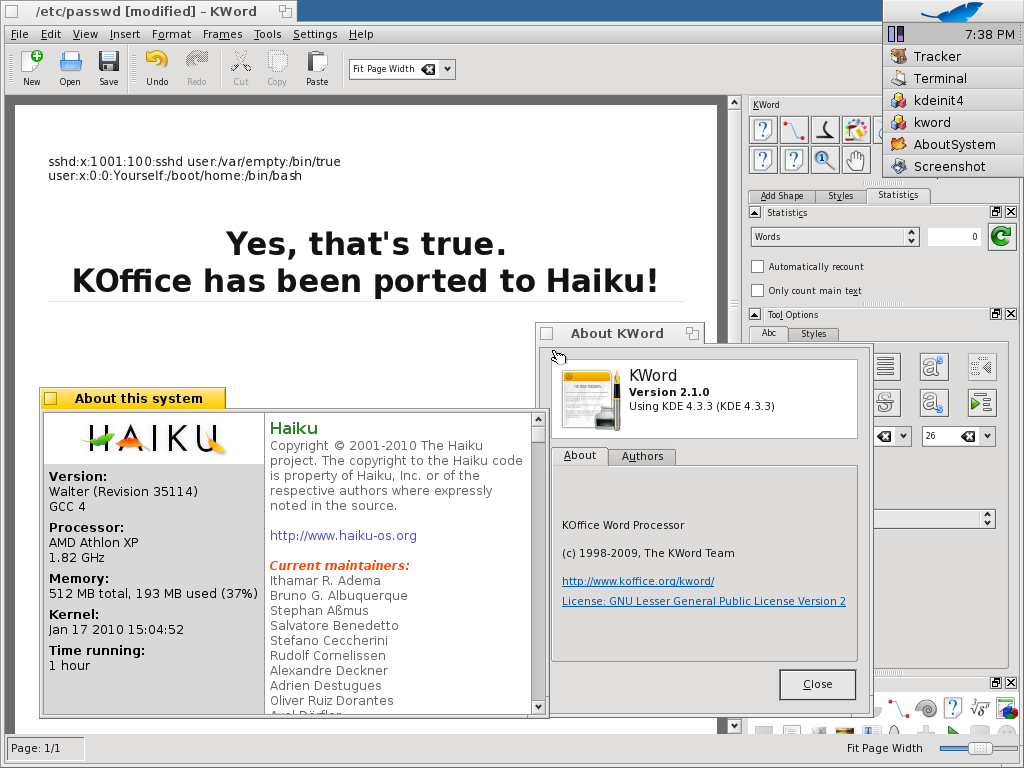
Experimental port of KOffice 2.1 to Haiku

This continued with version 2.1 in November, 2009. Regular end-users requiring a stable environment were still recommended by developers to use the stable 1.6 release series. This version was also ported to Haiku but the port was later not updated for newer KOffice versions.

In May 2010, version 2.2.0 was released and brought an unprecedented number of new features and bugfixes. Kexi was integrated again. Kivio was not migrated. A new framework for effects on shapes and a new import filters for the Microsoft Office Open XML formats used in MS Office 2007 and later was added.

==== Community split ====
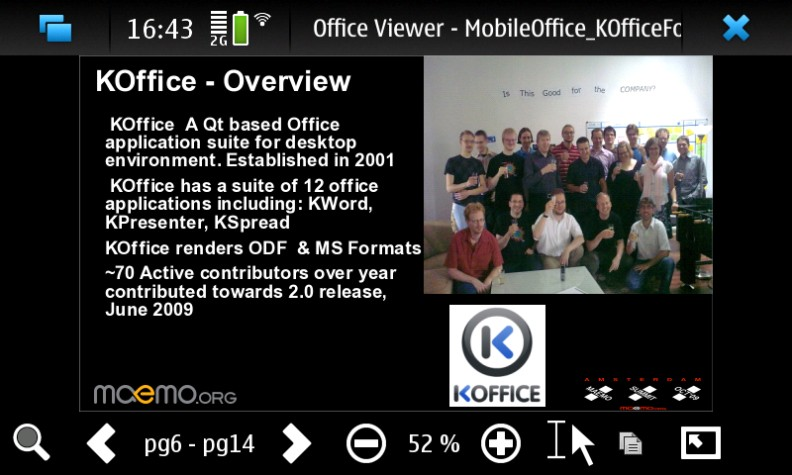
The viewer for smartphones was dropped from KOffice.

In mid-2010, following disagreements between KWord maintainer Thomas Zander and the other core developers, the KOffice community split into two separate communities, KOffice and Calligra. Following arbitration with the community members several applications were renamed by both communities. KOffice forked the KSpread spreadsheet utility to KCells, also the KPresenter presentation tool to KOffice Showcase, and the Karbon14 drawing tool to KOffice Artwork.

The community split coincided with the move from KDE's Subversion repository to Git. The Krita painting application, the Kexi database manager, and dedicated mobile platform GUI files were not migrated into the KOffice Git repository.

KOffice 2.3, released 31 December 2010, along with subsequent bugfix releases (2.3.1–2.3.3) was still a collaborative effort of both the KOffice and Calligra development teams. Kivio was still not integrated

Beginning with KOffice 2.4 the developers aimed to release new KOffice versions every six months in sync with SC4 releases but KOffice had seen no development activity since mid-March 2012. As of September 2013, Calligra has released 2.4 and 2.5 and 2.6 and 2.7. After two minor commits in August 2012 the koffice.org website was replaced by a placeholder in early September 2012. On 22 October 2012 KDE removed KOffice from their Quality Website Tools.

As of 2014 KOffice was declared as unmaintained by KDE.

== Components ==
The last formally released version of KOffice included the following components:

KWord	A word processor with style sheets and frame-support for DTP-style editing of complex layouts.
KSpread	A spreadsheet application with multiple sheet support, templates and more than 100 mathematical formulae.
KPresenter	A presentation program with image and effect support.
Kexi	An integrated data management application, designed as a Microsoft Access or FileMaker competitor. It can be used for designing and implementing databases, inserting and processing data and performing queries. It has limited compatibility with the MS Access file format.
Karbon14	A vector drawing application with a variety of drawing and editing tools – formerly known as Kontour and KIllustrator.
Krita	A digital painting program, with some image processing features – formerly known as Krayon and KImageshop.
KChart	Integrated report and chart generator.
KFormula	An integrated mathematical formula editor.
KPlato	A project management application that can create Gantt-style charts.

== Technical details ==
KOffice applications were developed using Qt and KDE Platform. All its components are released under free software licenses and use OpenDocument as their native file format when possible. KOffice was released separately from KDE SC 4 and can be downloaded from KDE's FTP server.

KOffice 2 underwent a large overhaul to use the Flake system of components and Pigment color system, as much as possible within applications. KOffice developers planned to share as much infrastructure as possible between applications to reduce bugs and improve the user experience. They also wanted to create an OpenDocument library for use in other KDE applications that will allow developers to easily add support for reading and outputting OpenDocument files to their applications. Automating tasks and extending the suite with custom functionality can be done with D-Bus or with scripting languages like Python, Ruby, and JavaScript.

== See also ==
- Comparison of office suites
- List of office suites
