= MobiOffice =

Computer program

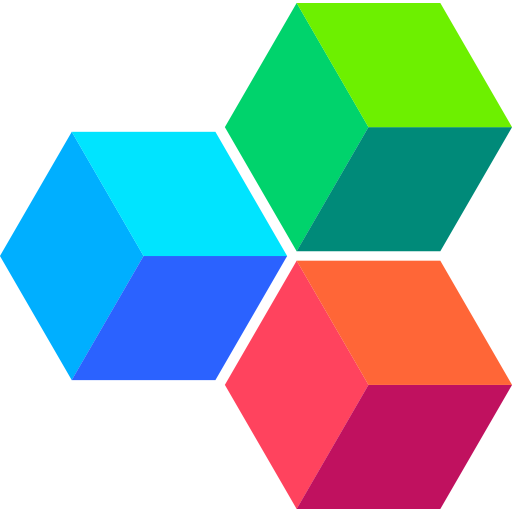
- Developer: MobiSystems
- Release: 2004

Stable release(s)
- Android: 12.0.39465 / 16 December 2021
- iOS: 9.4 / 19 January 2022
- Windows: 6.30.43840 / 2021
- Operating system: Microsoft Windows 7 or later, Android 7.0 or later, iOS 13.0 or later, iPadOS 13.0 or later, ChromeOS, MacOS
- Platform: x86, x64, ARM, ARM64
- Available in: 53 languages
- Type: Office suite
- License: Freemium
- Website: mobisystems.com/en-us/mobioffice

MobiOffice (formerly OfficeSuite) is a proprietary cross-platform office suite application developed by MobiSystems. It has versions for Android, iOS and Microsoft Windows and has compatibility with the most frequently used Microsoft Office file formats. The software has over 220 million downloads on Google Play and is among the top Android business applications.

MobiOffice is preinstalled on devices by Sony, Amazon, Alcatel, Sharp, Toshiba, ZTE, Huawei, Kyocera and more.

== History ==
The software was first released as a mobile application on Palm OS in 2004 (incorporating older MobiSystems apps: Quick Spell, Quick Check and Quick Write), followed by Symbian in 2005.

Until 2009, OfficeSuite (MobiOffice's former name) was mainly used as a reader. Later, MobiSystems received an inquiry by Sony for an Android-based office solution development, however it was required in just 12 weeks. Apparently the developers succeeded and Sony preinstalled the newly developed OfficeSuite on all of their Android devices in 2009.

The software debuted on iOS in 2013, and the first desktop client version for Windows appeared in 2016.

Besides the ability to connect to any cloud provider such as Google Drive, Box, iCloud, OneDrive and more, MobiOffice offers storage space in MobiSystems's proprietary cloud: MobiDrive.

In 2018 the app was selected by Google to be among the few to receive the Android Excellence Award.

== MobiOffice components ==
- MobiDocs -Text editor
- MobiSheets - Spreadsheet editor
- MobiSlides - Presentation programs

== Types of licenses ==
=== Android (including Chromebooks) ===
Sources:

- MobiOffice Free version - upgradable to either MobiOffice Pro or *MobiOffice Personal/Premium
- MobiOffice Pro Trial - upgradable to MobiOffice Pro
- MobiOffice Pro - upgradable to *MobiOffice Personal/Premium

=== iOS ===
- MobiOffice Free - upgradable to either MobiOffice Pro or *MobiOffice Personal/Premium
- MobiOffice Pro - upgradable to *MobiOffice Personal/Premium

=== Windows ===
- MobiOffice Basic - free version
- MobiOffice Personal*
- MobiOffice Group
- MobiOffice Business

Different prices and plans for Personal, Group and Business licenses are available.

*MobiOffice Personal/Premium offers cross-platform usage with a single license.

== Software versions' features ==
1. MobiOffice is compatible with Microsoft Word, Microsoft Excel, Microsoft PowerPoint, and Adobe PDF files.
2. MobiOffice Pro is compatible with all of the above and is able to print, convert PDF to Word, Excel, ePUB, save as PDF and could create password protected files. It has a track changes option.
3. MobiOffice Personal/Premium is compatible with all of the above, but it can also add camera photos, PDF annotations, save as CSV and create conditional formatting in Excel. It also introduces the cross-platform functionalities and enables the users to install MobiOffice on all of the three platforms (Android, iOS and Windows) using a single license purchase.

The software can edit and manage the files, as well as format text font, color, size, and style, and has other features common to office suite software.

== Supported file formats ==
MobiOffice offers full compatibility with Microsoft formats on all platforms. The software also has additional support for common formats (that may vary for different platforms) and a PDF module that enables users to open, edit and export to PDF files, including PDF camera scanning.

=== MobiOffice for Android supports ===
Open files: DOC, DOCX, DOCM, XLS, XLSX, XLSM, PPT, PPTX, PPS, PPSX, PPTM, PPSM, RTF, TXT, LOG, CSV, EML, ZIP, ODT, ODS, OD

Save/Save as files: DOC, DOCX, DOCM, XLS, XLSX, XLSM, PPT, PPTX, PPS, PPSX, PPTM, PPSM, RTF, TXT, LOG, CSV, EML, ZIP, ODT, ODS, ODP

=== MobiOffice for iOS supports ===
Open files: DOX, DOTX, DOCM, DOC, TXT, RTF, ODT (partial support), XSLX, XLTX, XLSM, XLS, CSV, PDF, PPTX, PPSX, POTX, PPTM, PPSM, POTM, PPT, POT, PPS.

Save/Save as files: DOX, DOTX, DOCM, DOC, TXT, RTF, ODT (partial support), XSLX, XLTX, XLSM, XLS, CSV, PDF, PPTX, PPSX, POTX, PPTM, PPSM, POTM, PPT, POT, PPS.

=== MobiOffice for Windows supports ===
Open files: DOX, DOTX, DOCM, DOC, TXT, RTF, ODT (partial support), XSLX, XLTX, XLSM, XLS, CSV, PDF, PPTX, PPSX, POTX, PPTM, PPSM, POTM, PPT, POT, PPS.

Save/Save as files: DOCX, DOTX, DOCM, DOC, TXT, RTF, XLSX, XLTX, XLSM, XLS, CSV, PDF, XPS, PPTX, PPSX, POTX, PPTM, PPSM, POTM, PPT, POT, PPS.

== Languages ==
=== MobiOffice for Android ===
Arabic, Bengali, Bosnian, Bulgarian, Catalan, Chinese (Traditional), Chinese (Hong Kong), Chinese (Simplified Chinese), Chinese (Taiwan), Croatian, Czech, Danish, Dutch, English, Estonian, Finnish, French, French (Canada), German, Greek (Modern), Hebrew, Hindi, Hungarian, Italian, Japanese, Kannada (India), Korean, Latvian, Lithuanian, Macedonian, Malay, Malayalam (India), Marathi (India), Norwegian Bokmål, Panjabi (Punjabi), Persian (Farsi), Polish, Portuguese (Brazil), Portuguese (Portugal), Romanian, Russian, Serbian, Slovak, Slovene, Spanish (LATAM), Spanish (Spain), Swedish, Tagalog, Tamil (India), Telugu (India), Thai, Turkish, Ukrainian, Vietnamese.

=== MobiOffice for IOS ===
English, French, German, Hindi, Italian, Japanese, Russian, Simplified Chinese, Spanish, Thai.

=== MobiOffice for Windows (PC) ===
English, French, German, Hindi, Italian, Japanese, Russian, Simplified Chinese, Spanish, Thai.

== See also ==
- Comparison of office suites
- List of office suites
- Microsoft Office
