= Polaris Office =

Proprietary office software suite

- Developer(s): Infraware Inc.

Stable release(s)
- Android: 9.6.3 / 23 December 2021
- iOS: 9.6.4 / 29 December 2021
- macOS: 9.0.30 / 3 December 2021
- Windows: 9.113.79 / 28 December 2021
- Platform: Android, iOS, bada & Windows Mobile, MacOS
- Available in: 16 languages
- Type: Office Suite
- License: Proprietary
- Website: www.polarisoffice.com

Polaris Office is a freemium office suite that runs on platforms such as Android, iOS, Windows and macOS, a product of Korea-based software firm Infraware, Inc. It allows the editing of Microsoft Office file-formats (doc/docx, hwp, ppt/pptx, txt, xls/xlsx) and the viewing of PDF files. All files saved in Polaris Office are synchronized with other connected devices, and thus documents are automatically updated to the latest version. It also provides a variety of cloud-storage services such as Box, Dropbox, Google Drive, OneDrive, etc. Moreover, Polaris Office has an agent program that allows uploading and downloading documents from a desktop computer to a mobile device. It is available in several languages.

== See also ==
- Comparison of office suites
- List of office suites
