= K Desktop Environment 2 =

2000 free software

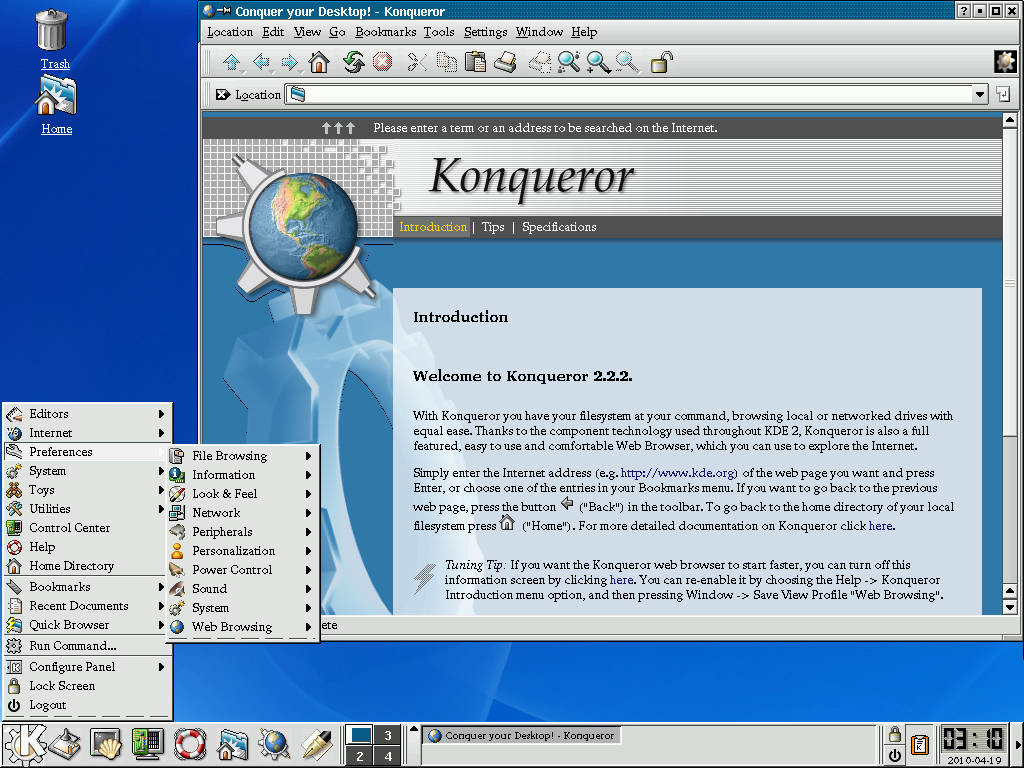
- K Desktop Environment 2.2.2
- Developer: KDE
- Release: 23 October 2000; 25 years ago
- Final release: 2.2.2 / 21 November 2001; 24 years ago
- Written in: C++ (Qt 2)
- Operating system: Unix-like with X11
- Predecessor: K Desktop Environment 1
- Successor: K Desktop Environment 3
- Type: Desktop environment
- Website: kde.org

K Desktop Environment 2 was the second series of releases of the K Desktop Environment. There were three major releases in this series.

== Major updates ==
K Desktop Environment 2 introduced significant technological improvements compared to its predecessor.

DCOP (Desktop COmmunication Protocol), a client-to-client communications protocol intermediated by a server over the standard X11 ICE library.

KIO, an application I/O library. It is network transparent and can access HTTP, FTP, PoP, IMAP, NFS, SMB, LDAP and local files. Moreover, its design permits developers to "drop in" additional protocols, such as WebDAV, which will then automatically be available to all KDE applications. KIO can also locate handlers for specified MIME types; these handlers can then be embedded within the requesting application using the KParts technology.

KParts, a component object model, allows an application to embed another within itself. The technology handles all aspects of the embedding, such as positioning toolbars and inserting the proper menus when the embedded component is activated or deactivated. KParts can also interface with the KIO trader to locate available handlers for specific MIME types or services/protocols.

KHTML, an HTML 4.0 compliant rendering and drawing engine. It supports many Internet technologies, including JavaScript, Java, HTML 4.0, CSS 2, and SSL for secure communications. It is compatible with Netscape plugins such as Flash. KHTML also has the capacity to embed components within itself using the KParts technology.

== K Desktop Environment 2.0 ==
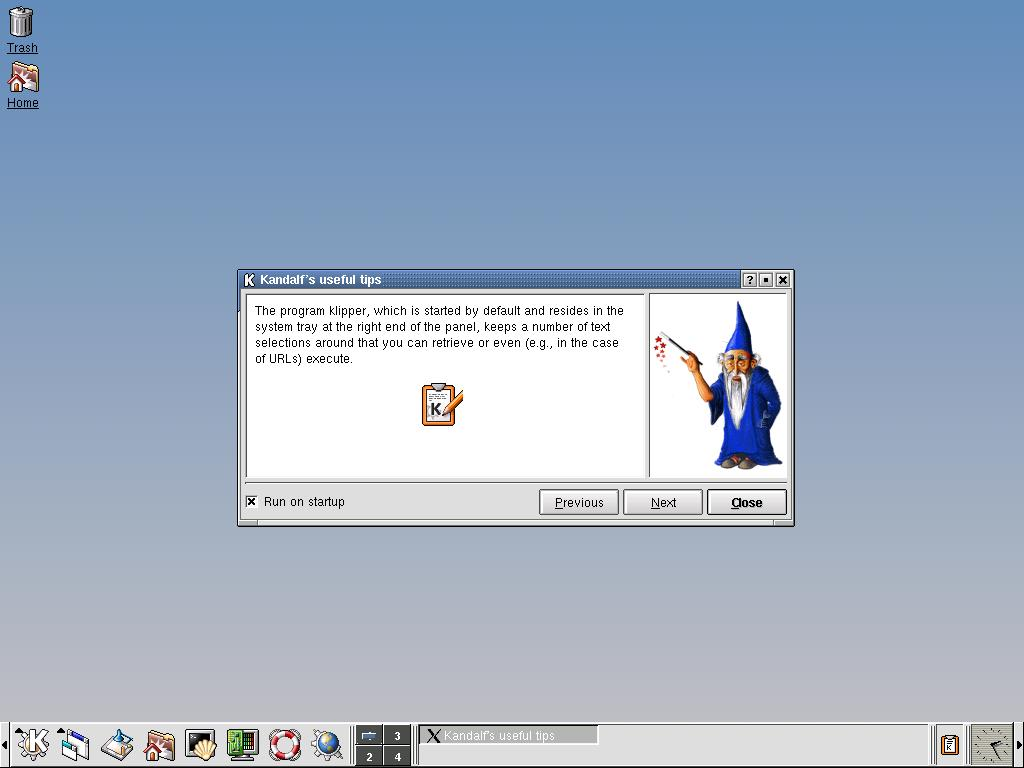
K Desktop Environment 2.0 showing Kandalf with a tip of the day

Konqueror was introduced as web browser, file manager and document viewer. It used KHTML for displaying web pages.

K Desktop Environment 2 also shipped with the initial release of the KOffice suite, consisting of a spreadsheet application (KSpread), a vector drawing application (KIllustrator), a frame-based word-processing application (KWord), a presentation program (KPresenter), and a chart and diagram application (KChart). Native file formats were XML-based. KOffice included a scripting language and the ability to embed individual components within each other using KParts.

== K Desktop Environment 2.1 ==
The K Desktop Environment 2.1 release inaugurated the media player noatun, which used a modular, plugin design. For development, K Desktop Environment 2.1 was bundled with KDevelop.

== K Desktop Environment 2.2 ==
The KDE 2.2 release featured up to a 50% improvement in application startup time on Linux systems and increased stability and capabilities for HTML rendering and JavaScript. A number of new plugins were included in Konqueror. KMail received the addition of IMAP support (including SSL and TLS), while KOrganizer got native iCalendar support. Other improvements included a new plugin-based print architecture and a personalization wizard.

=== KDE Restoration Project ===
After celebrating KDE’s 20th birthday with a re-release of K Desktop Environment 1.1.2 on 14 October 2016, KDE and Fedora contributor Helio Chissini de Castro also did re-releases of Qt2 in October 2017 and KDELibs 2.2.2 in December 2017.

== Release schedule ==
Date	Event
2.0
23 October 2000	KDE 2.0 released
5 December 2000	2.0.1 Maintenance release.
2.1
26 February 2001	KDE 2.1 released
27 March 2001	2.1.1 Maintenance release.
30 April 2001	2.1.2 Maintenance release (kdelibs only).
2.2
15 August 2001	KDE 2.2 released
19 September 2001	2.2.1 Maintenance release.
21 November 2001	2.2.2 Maintenance release.
21 December 2017	2.2.2 Restoration re-release.
