= Ability Office =

Office suite

- Developer: Ability Software International
- Release: September 1996; 30 years ago
- Stable release: 11 / February 2022
- Operating system: Microsoft Windows
- Type: Office suite
- License: Proprietary
- Website: www.ability.com

Ability Office is an office suite developed by Ability Plus Software and distributed and marketed by Ability Software International which consists of a word processor, spreadsheet, database, modules for presentation and photo or image editing, plus a photo/image organizer and vector line drawing application.

== Development history ==
Development began in 1992 following a decision to replace Ability Plus, an existing DOS-based integrated package, and a first release was made in 1995 called Ability for Windows and consisted of modules for word processing, spreadsheet, database and communications (a terminal program).

A second version was released in 1998 called Ability Office 98. The framework for the entire suite was changed from Borland OWL to Microsoft MFC resulting in better performance and the database was re-written to use the Jet Database Engine.

Since then, modules have been added (an image editing module in 2000 and a presentation module in 2004) but the architecture has broadly remained the same with the step to a fully Unicode version being made in 2008.

== OEM versions ==
In October 2006, Tesco launched a range of own-brand software that included Tesco Complete Office, a Tesco-branded version of Ability Office.

Corel (Home) Office and Corel Home Suite are based on Ability Office 5.

== See also ==
- List of office suites
- Comparison of office suites
