= Ability Plus =

Integrated software package

- Screenshot of Ability Plus 3.0
- Initial release: early 1980s
- Operating system: DOS
- Type: Office suite
- License: Proprietary
- Website: www.ability.com

Ability Plus is an integrated software package written for DOS in the early 1980s. Development ceased in 1995 with the last build made in November 1997. It was succeeded by Ability Office on Windows, described below.

Ability combined write, spreadsheet, database, graphing and communication functions in a single interface called the Library Screen. The main modules were written from the ground up to share as much code as possible so that, for example, a field in the write or database module would call on the same recalculation engine as the spreadsheet and the display and print routines were common to all modules.

Despite lack of development for over a decade, Ability Plus 3.0, the last version, runs under a Windows 7 command prompt.

== Marketing history ==
Xanaro Technologies, in Toronto, Ontario, initially sought to market Ability in 1984. After a business reorganization at the request of the investors, the product was taken over by Migent Inc, Incline Village, Nevada, around 1984/85 and released as Ability 1.2 in 1985.

A new version called Ability Plus was released in 1987 by Migent, that saw the product translated into a French, German, Spanish, Italian, Dutch and other European languages.

Around this time in Europe, Ability 1.2 and Ability Plus 1.0 were widely bundled with the Amstrad PC1512 and PC1640 personal computers. In 1987 Ability Plus won the Barclays Bank British Micro Computing Award.

Migent Inc had several products, including the first "pocket modem", but fell into financial difficulty for reasons largely unrelated to Ability (for example, see Migent vs Ashton-Tate) and eventually reversed into LANware Inc, Markham, Canada in 1989. Migent (UK) Ltd, based in London, continued for a few more years, eventually closing in 1991.

Later on in 1991, a new company was set up in the UK, Ability Plus Software (UK) Ltd, and it joined forces with LANware, with new funding, to develop and market a new version of Ability Plus (version 2.0) which was released in 1992 and then version 3.0 in 1995.

By this time, the popularity of DOS-based programs was in decline and in addition, Ability Plus suffered from the lack of development investment in the period following the launch of version 1.0 (almost no development took place from 1988 to 1991).

== Development ==
Ability was originally developed by a team all of whom came from the University of Waterloo, Ontario, Canada. By the time of Ability Plus, the majority of the code was in C with a small amount of assembly.

The following list of contributors is lifted directly from the Ability Plus line of source code, in approximately chronological order, with given year showing an earliest date for "first appearance": (1984) Ashok Patel, Tracey Allen, Andrew Forber, Richard B. McMurray, Tom Keith, Mike Gore, Drew Sullivan, Tom Dressing, David (Collier-) Brown, Karen Banks, (1986) Michael Smith, Rita Kan, Pete Sketch, (1991) Phil Roach, Mike King, Mike Young, J Raymond, Vassil Stoilov, George Georiev.

== Windows version ==
In the early 1990s, some thought was given to making a Windows version of Ability Plus, but the difficulties in fashioning a Windows program from DOS code led to the decision to start from scratch. The outcome of this line of development was Ability Office, and although it shares no source code with the Ability Plus, an attempt was made to follow some of the design principles of the original such as shared code and a common recalculation engine.
