= Hancom Office =

Proprietary office suite

- Developer: Hancom Inc.
- Release: 1996; 30 years ago
- Written in: Java, C++
- Operating system: Online Server: Unknown, Clients: All devices with a modern web browser Apps: Android, iOS, macOS and Windows
- Type: Office suite
- License: Proprietary closed source
- Website: www.hancom.com/main/main.do

Hancom Office is a proprietary office suite that includes a word processor, spreadsheet software, presentation software, and a PDF editor as well as their online versions accessible via a web browser. It is primarily addressed to Korean users.

In May 2017 Hancom lost a lawsuit in US Federal Court for violating the GNU GPL license as a consequence of using the source code of PostScript and PDF interpreter Ghostscript. Ghostscript is dual licensed under both the Affero GPL License, or a commercial license. Under the Affero GPL terms, Hancom would be required to open source their code. Alternatively, they could have purchased a license.

Hancom Office is written in Java and C++ that runs on Android, iOS, macOS and Windows platforms.

== Products ==
- Hangul - Hangul is a word processor developed by Hancom. It is a product that eliminates the inconvenience of the original Hangul word processor, which was limited to Hangul cards or PC models. Originally, the name was written using the '아래아' character, a vowel letter that is obsolete in modern Korean, and it was referred to as 'HWP' (an abbreviation for Hangul Word Processor), '아래아 한글' (Arae-a Hangul), '한/글' (Han/Geul), and so on. Hangul is currently the most widely used word processor in South Korea, often used alongside Microsoft Word.
- HanWord - word processor compatible with Word
- HanCell - spreadsheet program
- HanShow - presentation program
- Hancom Office Hanword Viewer - For viewing documents created by Hancom Office or Microsoft Office

== See also ==
- Comparison of office suites
- List of office suites
