= Corel Presentations =

Presentation program

Presentations
- Developer: Corel Corporation
- Stable release: 2021 / May 6, 2021
- Operating system: Microsoft Windows
- Type: Presentation
- License: Proprietary
- Website: www.corel.com

Corel Presentations, often referred to simply as Presentations, is a presentation program akin to Microsoft PowerPoint and LibreOffice Impress. The current release, version 2021 (Release 21 internally), is available only as part of Corel's WordPerfect Office productivity suite.

== History ==
Presentations shares much of its code with WordPerfect. It originally evolved from DrawPerfect, a MS-DOS-based drawing program released in 1990 by the now-defunct WordPerfect Corporation. The first version, WordPerfect Presentations 2.0 for DOS, appeared in 1993, and was followed by a Microsoft Windows port of the DOS version a few months later. Novell acquired WordPerfect Corporation in April 1994 and shipped an upgrade of Presentations, Novell Presentations 3.0 for Windows, as part of the Novell PerfectOffice 3.0 for Windows productivity suite in December 1994.

Corel acquired PerfectOffice in January 1996 and released the first 32-bit version of Presentations in May of that year. Since then, the company has issued version 8 (1997), version 9 (1999), version 10 (2001), version 11 (2003), version 12 (2004), version 13 (2006), version 14 (2008), version 15 (2010), version 16 (2012), version 17 (2014), version 18 (2016), version 19 (2018), version 20 (2020) and version 21 (2021). The last DOS release, version 2.1, appeared in 1997 as part of the Corel WordPerfect Suite for DOS.

Corel Presentations for Linux was included with the various editions of Corel WordPerfect Office for Linux. Corel no longer develops programs for the Linux operating system.

== Interface ==
Over the years, the program's interface has evolved to more closely resemble that of Microsoft PowerPoint. Its primary strengths remain in the areas of graphics manipulation, although it does include a number of transition and animation effects. The program also has the ability to save to Microsoft PowerPoint and PDF formats, as well as to publish presentations to the Internet.

== Features ==
Corel Presentations can create effective and in-depth presentations. This program includes a number of templates and different types of slide shows to help to lay out a show. The templates include a set background, font, color and set up of the slide. These defaults can be changed within the slide show. It has always included a Bitmap Editor which works like a paintbrush program and even allows for the alteration of individual pixels.

== See also ==
- Comparison of office suites
- Keynote (presentation software)
