= Calligra =

Business software

Calligra Suite

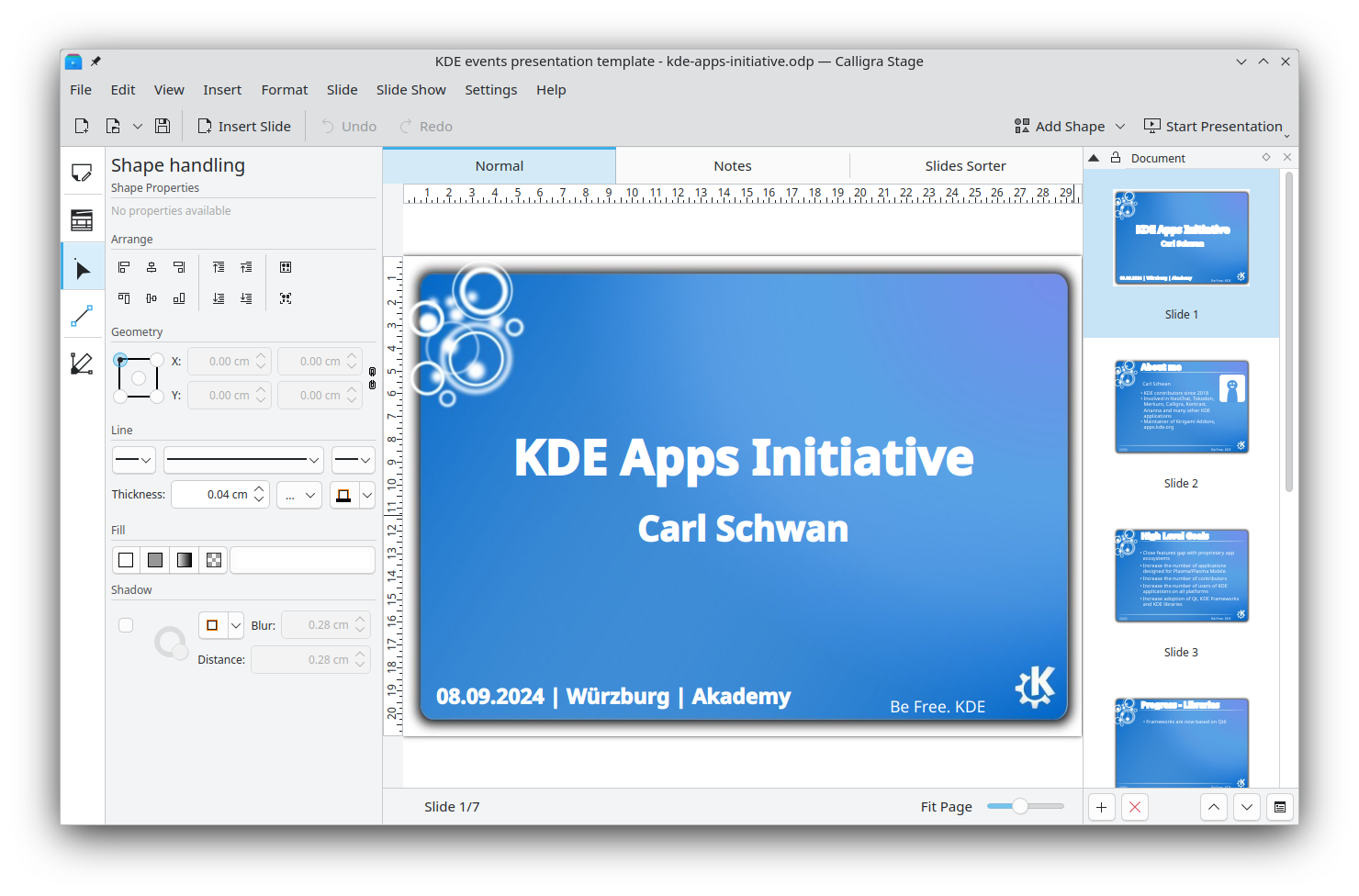
- Calligra Stage screenshot
- Developer: KDE
- Release: 23 October 2000; 26 years ago (as KOffice); 11 April 2012; 14 years ago (as Calligra 2.4)
- Stable release: 26.11.80 / 13 November 2026
- Written in: C++ (Qt, KDE Platform)
- Operating system: Unix-like, Windows, Android
- Size: ~185 MB (xz-compressed source code), ~20 MB (all translations)
- Standard: OpenDocument (ISO/IEC 26300)
- Available in: 31 languages
- Type: Graphic art and office suite
- License: GPL, LGPL
- Website: calligra.org
- Repository: invent.kde.org/office/calligra

Calligra Suite is a graphic art and office suite by KDE. It is available for desktop PCs, tablet computers, and smartphones. It contains applications for word processing, spreadsheets, presentation, databases, vector graphics, and digital painting.

Calligra uses the OpenDocument format as its default file format for most applications and can import other formats, such as Microsoft Office formats. Calligra relies on KDE technology and is often used in combination with KDE Plasma Workspaces.

== Supported systems ==
=== Desktops ===
Calligra's main platform is desktop PCs running Linux, FreeBSD, macOS, and Windows, of which Linux is the best supported system.

On desktop systems, the whole range of features is available.

=== Smartphones and tablets ===
As of 2014, Calligra's efforts to create touchscreen-friendly versions are centered on reusable Qt Quick components. For smartphone-like formfactors 3rd party documents viewers Coffice for Android and Sailfish Office for Sailfish OS are available that make use of these components.

Icon of Calligra Gemini

The Calligra project shipped Krita Sketch/Gemini and the tablet-focused Plasma Active document viewer with Calligra 2.8. Calligra 2.9 ships Calligra Gemini, an enhanced version of Calligra Active with added document editing features and runtime switching between desktop and touchscreen interfaces.

== History ==
Major releases
Version	Key feature	Date
2.4	First release	2012-04-11
2.5	Tablet version	2012-08-13
2.6	Calligra Author	2013-02-05
2.7	New toolbox for Words	2013-08-01
2.8	Krita Gemini	2014-03-05
2.9	Calligra Gemini	2015-02-26
3.0	Remove Author, Stage, Flow, Braindump	2017-01-15
3.1.0	Words, Sheets, Karbon, Gemini, and Plan.	2018-02-01
3.2	Gemini, Karbon and Stage	2020-04-29
4.0	Port to Qt6 and new interface	2024-08-27

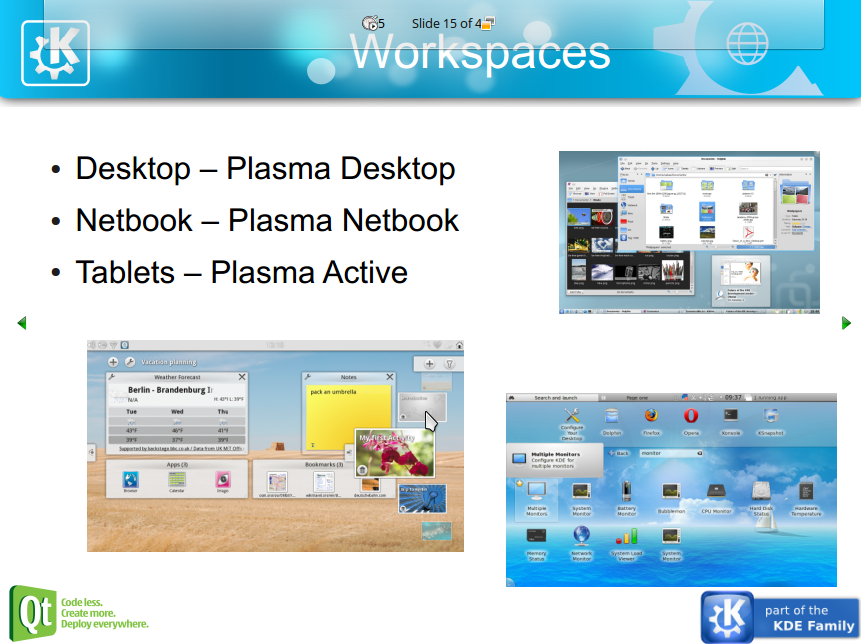
Calligra Active 2.5 displaying a presentation

Calligra was created after disagreements within the KOffice community in 2010 – between KWord maintainer Thomas Zander and the other core developers. (See KOffice § History.) Following arbitration with the community members, several applications were renamed by both parties. Most developers, and all but KWord maintainer Thomas Zander, of particular applications joined the Calligra project. Three applications, Kexi, Krita and KPlato and the user interfaces for mobile devices have been completely moved out of KOffice and are only available within Calligra. A new application called Braindump has been added to Calligra after the split and KWord was replaced by the new word processor Calligra Words.

KOffice 2.3, released 31 December 2010, along with subsequent bugfix releases (2.3.1–2.3.3) was still a collaborative effort of both the KOffice and Calligra development teams. According to its developers, this version is stable enough for real use, and Karbon14, Krita and KSpread are recommended for production work.

On 18 May 2011, the Calligra team began releasing monthly snapshots while preparing for the release of Calligra 2.4.

The first version of the Calligra Suite for Windows was released on 21 December 2011. The package is labeled as “highly experimental” and “not yet suitable for daily use”.

The Calligra team was originally scheduled to release the final 2.4 version in January 2012 but problems in the undo/redo feature of Words and Stage required a partial rewrite and caused a delay. Calligra 2.4 was released on 11 April 2012.

Calligra 2.4 launched with two mobile-oriented user interfaces: Calligra Mobile and Calligra Active. Calligra Mobile's development was initiated in summer 2009 and was first shown during Akademy / Desktop Summit 2009 by KO GmbH as a simple port of KOffice to Maemo. Later Nokia hired KO to assist them with a full-fledged mobile version, including a touchscreen-friendly user interface which was presented by Nokia during Maemo Conference in October 2009. The first alpha version was made available in January 2010. Along with the launch of the Nokia N9 smartphone, Nokia released its own Poppler and Calligra-based office document viewer under GPL.

Calligra Active was launched in 2011 after the Plasma Active initiative to provide a document viewer similar to Calligra Mobile but for tablet computers.

In December 2012, KDE, KO GmbH, and Intel released Krita Sketch, a variant of Calligra's Krita painting application, for Windows 7 and 8.

On 24 March 2013, KDE developer Sebastian Sauer released Coffice, a Calligra-based document viewer, for Android.

Jolla continued Nokia's efforts on a smartphone version. In 2013 Jolla launched Sailfish Office. Sailfish Office reuses the Qt Quick components from Calligra Active.

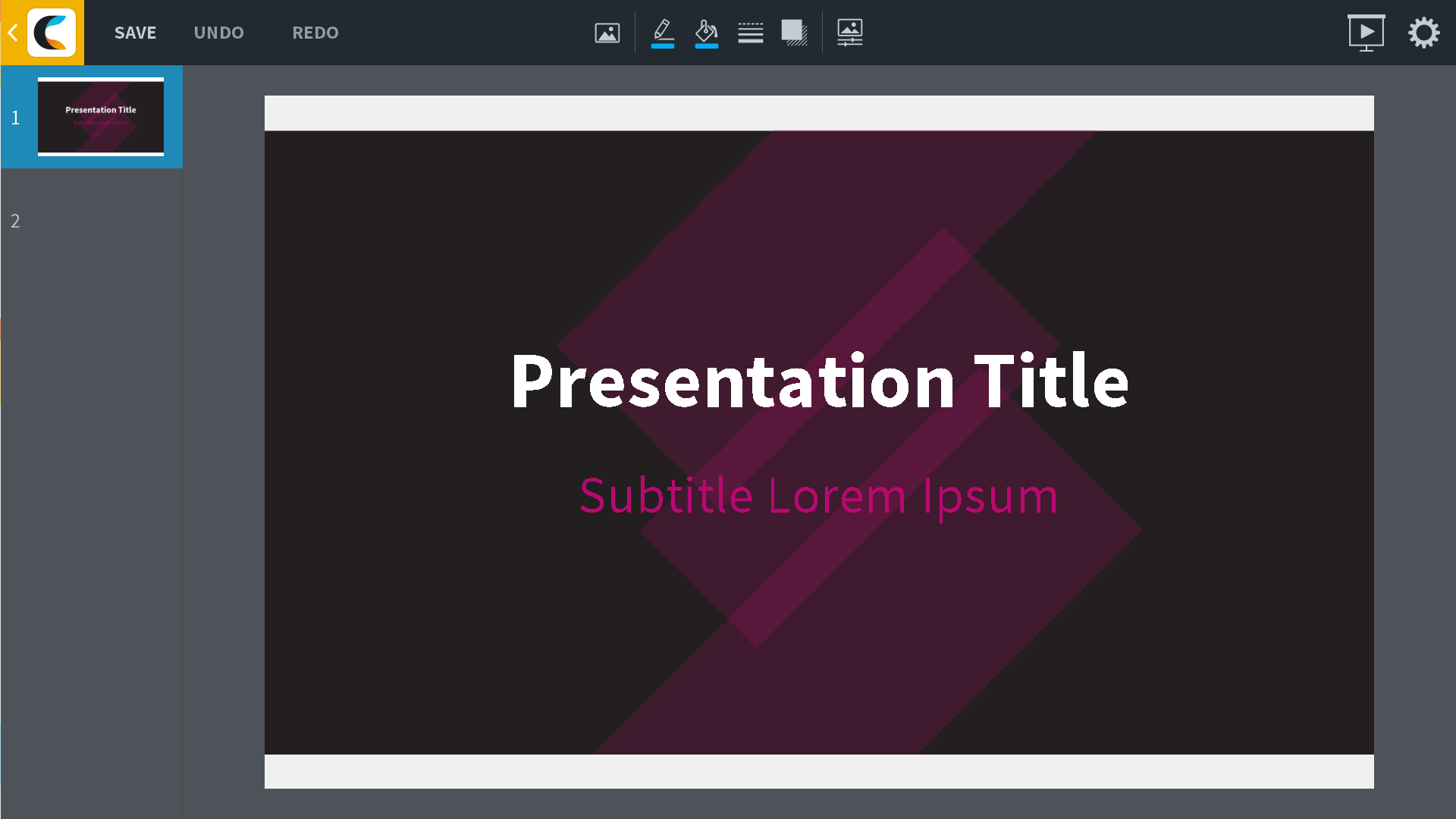
Calligra Gemini displaying a presentation

In September 2013 a merger of Krita and Krita Sketch, named Krita Gemini, was launched on Windows 8.1. Development was funded by Intel to promote 2in1 convertible notebooks. On 5 March 2014 Krita Sketch and Gemini were also released as part of Calligra 2.8 for non-Windows platforms.

In April 2014, Intel and KO GmbH extended the promotion deal to Gemini versions of Stage and Words. On 28 August 2014, the first snapshot of Calligra Gemini was released by KO GmbH for Windows. On 21 November 2014, KDE announced that Calligra Gemini would officially be released as part of Calligra 2.9. As with Krita, this Gemini release adds a touchscreen interface to Words and Stage and users can switch between desktop and touch mode at runtime. Calligra Gemini is a continuation of Calligra Active and Sailfish Office developments but with added editing capabilities. On 19 October 2014, a Linux version was presented.

The koffice.org website was replaced by a placeholder in early September 2012. As of 2014 KOffice was declared unmaintained by KDE. The koffice.org domain now redirects to Calligra.org.

In Autumn 2015, Krita was split off into a project independent from Calligra, with the then current 2.9 versions though still developed as part of Calligra 2.9.

== Components ==
Current list of components
Icon	Name	Description
	Words	A word processor with the ability to edit and save ISO/IEC 26300 OpenDocument Text (.odt) as part of OpenDocument Type ISO standard.
	Sheets	A spreadsheet program, formerly known as KSpread and Calligra Tables.
	Stage	A presentation program. It was removed in Calligra 3.0, but returned in Calligra 3.2.
	Karbon	A vector graphics editor, formerly known as Karbon14.

List of former components
Icon	Name	Description
	Braindump	A digital notetaking tool, similar to Microsoft OneNote. It was removed in Calligra 3.0.
	Flow	A programmable flowchart drawing program with dynamically loadable stencils, successor of koffice Kivio (though it could not load/import kivio files). It was removed in Calligra 3.0, then was retired and replaced by Karbon in 3.2.0.
	Krita	A digital painting program with some image editing features. Formerly known as Krayon and KImageshop. It was removed from Calligra 3.0 after becoming an independent product.
	Author	An e-book authoring application like iBooks Author with EPUB export, introduced with Calligra Suite 2.6. It was removed in Calligra 3.0.
	Kexi	KEXI is a visual database applications creator. It can be used for designing database applications, inserting and editing data, performing queries, and processing data. Forms can be created to provide a custom interface to your data. All database objects – tables, queries, forms, reports – are stored in the database, making it easy to share data and design. It was spun-off from Calligra 4.0 as an independent product.
	Plan	A project management application that can create Gantt charts. Formerly known as KPlato. It was spun-off from Calligra 4.0 as an independent product.

== Reception ==
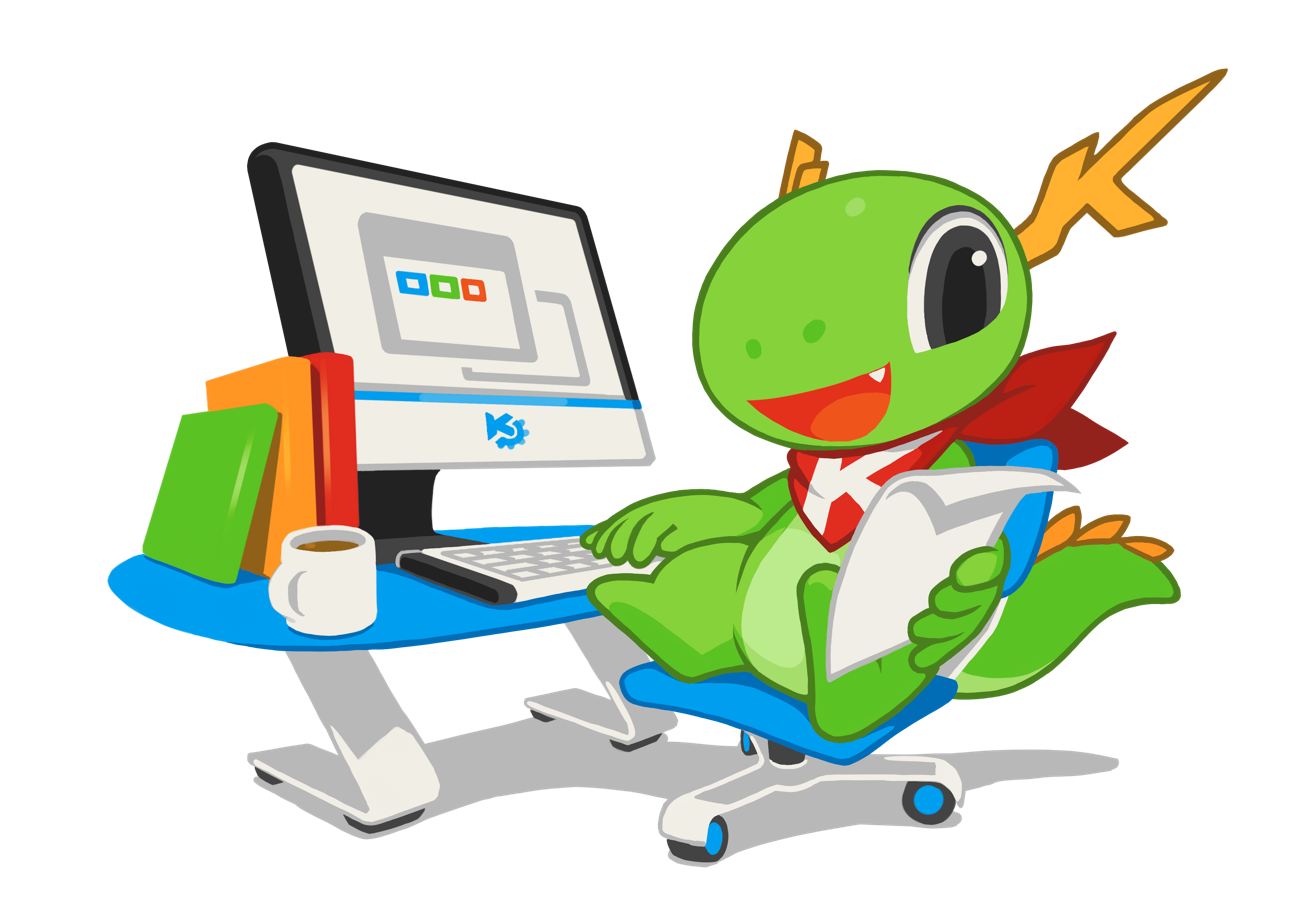
KDE mascot Konqi and Calligra Suite.

Initial reception shortly after the 2.4 release was positive. Linux Pro Magazine Online's Bruce Byfield wrote "Calligra needed an impressive first release. Perhaps surprisingly, and to the development team's credit, it has managed one in 2.4", but also noted that "Words in particular is still lacking features". He concluded that Calligra is "worth keeping an eye on".

The German sister publication LinuxUser 10/2012 reviewed Calligra 2.5 on 12 September 2012. Its reception was mostly positive. Negative criticism centered on Words' stability: "During our review no Calligra module was completely free of crashes, however Words' crashes reached an amount that we cannot recommend it for general use." The reviewer Thomas Drilling on the other hand praised Calligra's usability, writing: "The consistent work flow, often stunningly intuitive workflows, and clear menu structure are well received." He then concluded: "The individual modules' quality varies: While Words shows weakness, image editor Krita, spreadsheet application Sheets, and presentation program Stage completely won us over. Flowcharting application Flow allures with its wide range of stencils which makes drawing flow charts come easy."

LinuxUser reviewed Calligra 2.6 in issue 3/2013. Reviewer Vincze-Aron Szabo reiterated positive criticism about Calligra's user interface and noted increased stability of Words compared to Calligra 2.5. Szabo's major point for negative criticism was Author's and Word's handling of long documents, resulting in decreased performance and crashes. The other reviewed components – Plan, Stage, Sheets, and Krita – were praised in terms of stability and intuitiveness.

Calligra 2.7 was reviewed by LinuxUser in its October 2013 issue. Thomas Drilling, the reviewer, drew a positive conclusion overall. Among the positive aspects he pointed out were better .docx file import than LibreOffice and the amount of new features gained by the new version of the suite. Source for negative criticism was once again Words' stability, although Drilling noted improvements in this regard.

Network World editor Bryan Lunduke wrote about Calligra 2.8 in March 2014: “Karbon is an astoundingly nice vector design tool, and Flow, a diagramming tool, is incredibly handy from the design point of view as well. […] And Words is a great word processor.” In August 2014 he wrote: “Calligra Suite has become a staple of my workflow even on non-KDE desktops.” Linux Insider also reviewed Calligra 2.8, concluding “Calligra Suite is a solid offering that has grown considerably since branching out from its traditional KOffice roots. It has something for everyone. Its tools fills the needs of writers, artists, content designers and office workers.”

In 2017, sempreupdate.com.br wrote: “[If you do not] depend on proprietary formats [...] especially .xls, .xlsx and .doc [...] and you use KDE it's worth trying. Yes, regarding LibreOffice Calligra is still two steps behind [but] it also brings small differentials that would be welcomed in LibreOffice.“

== Technical details ==
Calligra is written with dependencies on KDE Frameworks 6 and Qt 6. Older versions depend on KDE Frameworks 5/Qt5, KDE Platform 4 and Qt 4, and even older versions of KOffice depend on KDElibs and Qt 3. Despite that Calligra Suite is released independently of the KDE Software Compilation or of the KDE Applications.

All components of the Calligra Suite are released under free software licenses and use OpenDocument as their native file format when applicable.

The developers of Calligra plan to share as much infrastructure as possible between applications to reduce bugs and improve the user experience. This is done by common technologies like Flake and Pigment. Flake provides a way to handle shapes, which can contain text, images, formulas (via KFormula), charts (via KChart) or other objects, in a consistent way across all applications. The Calligra team also wants to create an OpenDocument library for use in other KDE applications that will allow developers to easily add support for reading and outputting OpenDocument files to their applications. Automating tasks and extending the suite with custom functionality can be done with D-Bus. Previously it was possible to also use scripting languages like Python, Ruby, and JavaScript through the Kross scripting framework.

== See also ==
- Comparison of office suites
- List of office suites
