= Kugar =

Software tool

- Original author(s): Keith Davis
- Developer(s): KDE, theKompany
- Initial release: September 21, 2000
- Final release: 1.6.3 / June 7, 2007; 18 years ago
- Written in: C++ (Qt)
- Operating system: Unix-like
- Available in: Multilingual
- Type: Report generator
- License: GNU General Public License
- Website: www.thekompany.com/projects/kugar/

Kugar is a discontinued tool for generating business quality reports for KOffice. The reports can be viewed and printed. It includes a standalone report viewer and a KParts report viewer. The latter means that any K Desktop Environment 3 application can embed the report viewing functionality and that reports can be viewed using the Konqueror browser.

Kugar works by merging application generated data with a template to produce the final report. Both the data and the template are specified using XML. This approach means that applications only need worry about generating the data itself. A template can be referenced via a URL which allows businesses to create a centrally managed template library.

== History ==
Kugar was developed by theKompany as derivative from Metaphrast, originally written by Keith Davis at Mutiny Bay Software, beginning in August 1999. theKompany released version 1.0 on 21 September 2000 which was based on K Desktop Environment 2 and Qt 2.2.0. On 21 February 2001 Kugar was donated to KDE for inclusion into KOffice. KOffice 1.1 – the last version based on K Desktop Environment 2 – was released as beta version on 24 April 2001 and already included Kugar as stable application. Kugar remained part of KOffice up to version 1.6.3. Kugar was not ported to become part of KOffice 2. Kexi’s new Report Designer – introduced in KOffice 2.2 on 28 May 2010 – served as replacement for Kugar.

== Features ==
- Report printing in PostScript.
- Database/data source neutral, data is supplied to the report engine in XML.
- Support for direct database access.
- Open report definition files, report layout is stored in XML.
- Full control of fonts, colors, text alignment and wrapping.
- Report Header/Footer.
- Page Header/Footer.
- Detail Section.
- Detail Header/Footer.
- Unlimited number of detail levels.
- Grand totals: count, sum, average, variance and standard deviation.
- Additional formatting (negative numbers, currency, commas for numbers and dates).
