= Hancom =

South Korean software company

Hancom (한글과컴퓨터)
- Type: Public (KRX: 030520)
- Industry: Computer software
- Founded: Oct. 9th, 1990 (Listed on KOSDAQ: Sep. 24, 1996)
- Headquarters: 10FL. Hancom Tower, 49, Daewangpangyo-ro 644 Beon-gil Sampyeong-dong, Bundang-gu, Seongnam-si, Gyeonggi-do, South Korea
- Key people: Byun, Sung-Jun, Kim, Yeon-Soo, CEO
- Products: Hangul; Asianux; Hangul Development Library Kit; Hancom Read-on
- Total assets: KRW 728.5 billion (Consolidated. 2025)
- Website: www.hancom.com

Hancom Inc. (KOSDAQ: 030520) is an office suite software developer in South Korea. Established in 1990, the company created Hangul, a native word processing program for the Korean language. The name comes from Korea's native writing system, hangul.

In May 2017 Hancom lost a lawsuit in US Federal Court for violating the GNU GPL license as a consequence of using the source code of PostScript and PDF interpreter Ghostscript. Ghostscript is dual licensed under both the Affero GPL License, or a commercial license. Under the Affero GPL terms, Hancom would be required to open source their code. Alternatively, they could have purchased a license.

On May 27, 2020, Hancom Group announced the unveiling of the latest version of Hancom Office.

== Hancom Office ==
Former logo

Former logo (~2016)

Hancom's Office Suite remains the company's main product. The suite is available in English and Korean.

== List of products ==
=== Current products ===
- Hancom Office Suite
  - Hangul - word processor
  - HanWord - word processor compatible with Word
  - HanCell - spreadsheet program
  - HanShow - presentation program
  - Hancom Office Hanword
  - Hancom Office Hanword Viewer
  - Hancom Office 2020 International Version
  - Hancom Docs
  - Hancom Docs Converter
  - Hancom Sign

=== Discontinued products ===
- Documen
- HanArum - office products
- HanGrim - vector drawing program
- Hangul Print - printing program
- HanMaek - Hangul I/O program
- HanTeX - Hangul TeX program
- NetHangul
