= Software suite =

Collection of related computer programs

A software suite (also known as an application suite) is a collection of computer programs (application software, or programming software) of related functionality, sharing a similar user interface and the ability to easily exchange data with each other.

== Features ==
Advantages

- Less costly than buying individual packages
- Identical or very similar graphical user interface (GUI)
- Designed to interface with each other
- Helps the learning curve of the user

Disadvantages

- Not all purchased features are always used by the user
- Takes a significant amount of disk space (bloatware), as compared to buying only the needed packages
- Requires effort to use the packages together

== Types ==
- Office suites, such as Microsoft Office
- Internet suites
- Graphics suite, such as Adobe Creative Cloud
- IDEs, such as Eclipse, and Visual Studio

== See also ==
- Application software
- Package manager
- Runtime environment
