= KWord =

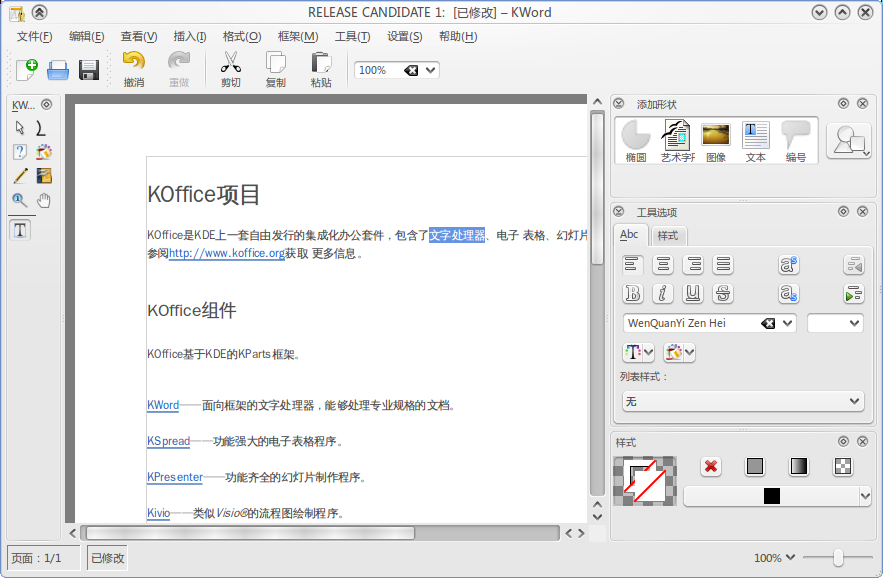
- KWord 2.0 screenshot
- Original author: Reginald Stadlbauer
- Developer: KDE
- Initial release: 1998; 28 years ago
- Final release: 2.3.3 / 23 February 2011
- Operating system: Unix-like, Windows
- Available in: Multilingual
- Type: Word processor, Desktop publishing
- License: LGPL
- Website: www.koffice.org/kword/
- Repository: github.com/KDE/koffice

KWord is a deprecated word processor and a desktop publishing application, part of the KOffice suite. It has been obsoleted by Calligra Words of the Calligra Suite.

== History ==
KWord was created by Reginald Stadlbauer as part of the KOffice project in 1998 using several ideas from FrameMaker, such as the use of frames. The original author confessed that the application and its code were not top notch since it was his first object-oriented application.

Until 2012, KWord was being actively developed along with the rest of the KOffice suite. Beginning with KOffice 2.4 the developers aimed to release new KOffice versions every six months in sync with SC4 releases but KOffice had seen no development activity since mid-March 2012.

After two minor commits in August 2012 the koffice.org website was replaced by a placeholder in early September 2012. On October 22, 2012 KDE removed KOffice from their Quality Website Tools.

== Features ==
The text-layout scheme in KWord is based on frames, making it similar to FrameMaker by Adobe. These can be placed anywhere on the page, and can incorporate text, graphics and embedded objects. Each new page is a new frame, but the text is able to flow through KWord's ability to link frames together. The use of frames means that complex graphical layouts can be achieved relatively easily in KWord.

Many desktop publishing (DTP) applications use frames, much like KWord does, but these DTP applications use a concept called master pages which gives the power to the user to design the structure of the document. However, KWord developers designed the frames usage to be a usable variant of master pages, with intelligent copying of frames and their position when a new page is created, for example when there is too much text for a page.
