= Graphics suite =

A graphics suite is a software suite for graphics work that are distributed together. The programs are usually able to interact with each other on a higher level than the operating system would normally allow.

There is no hard, fast rule regarding the programs to be included in a graphics application suite, but most will include at least a bitmap graphics editor and a vector graphics editor. In addition to these, the suite may contain VRML editors, animation editors, and morphing tools.

== See also ==
- Adobe graphics suite
- CorelDRAW Graphics Suite
- Microsoft Expression Studio
