= LibreOffice Base =

Open-source database application

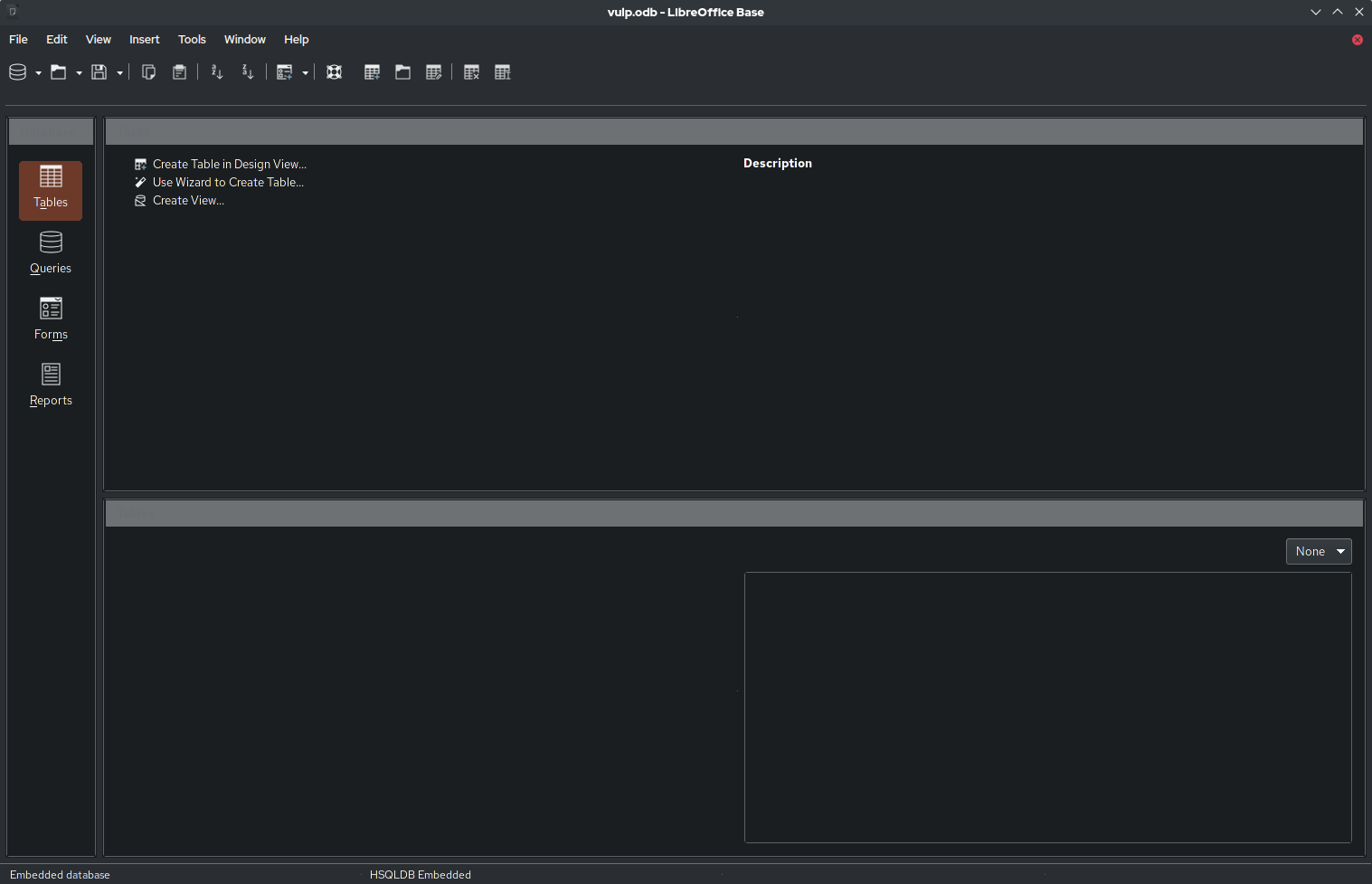
- LibreOffice Base 7.2.4 (released in December 2021, running on Linux and KDE Plasma 5 with the Breeze icon set)
- Developer: The Document Foundation

Stable release(s)
- Fresh: 26.2.5 / 24 July 2026; Still: 25.8.7 / 12 May 2026
- Operating system: Cross platform
- Type: RDBMS
- License: MPLv2.0 (secondary license GPL, LGPLv3+ or Apache License 2.0)
- Website: libreoffice.org/discover/base
- Repository: anongit.freedesktop.org/libreoffice/base

LibreOffice Base is a free and open-source database development and administration tool for relational database management systems that is part of the LibreOffice suite. LibreOffice Base was built off of a fork of OpenOffice.org and was first released as version 3.4.0.1 on October 4, 2011.

Similarly to the other packages in the LibreOffice suite, Base is supported across multiple platforms including Microsoft Windows, macOS, and Linux. Base is recognized for its cross-platform compatibility relative to Microsoft Access, which is developed exclusively for Windows.

== Features ==
LibreOffice Base is designed to allow users to easily create, access, modify, and view databases and their data. This is done by providing users with a graphical user interface that allows users to work with four main tools: Tables, queries, forms, and reports. Base includes software wizards to assist users with various aspects of the program. LibreOffice Base requires Java in order to create databases with forms, wizards, and more.

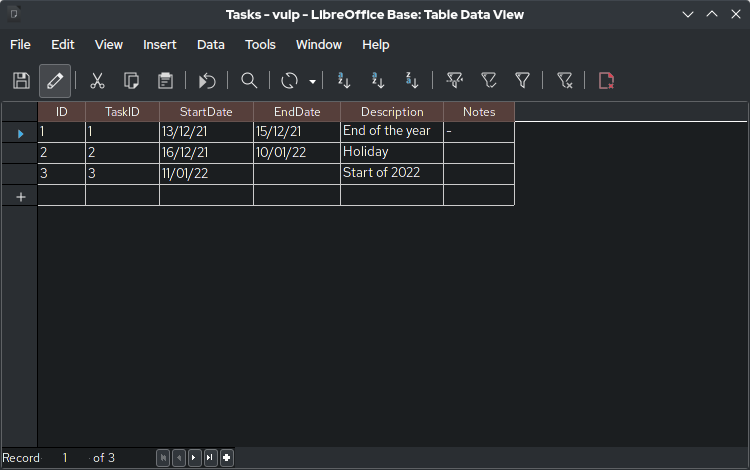
Table Data View in Libreoffice Base

Base is able to work with both embedded and external database files. Embedded databases are stored as a single file using C++ based Firebird and Java-based HSQLDB as its storage engine. When connecting to external databases, Base acts as a graphical user interface front-end to facilitate interactions with various database systems including Access Database Engine (ACE/JET), ODBC/JDBC data sources, MySQL, MariaDB, and PostgreSQL.

Base has been described as an unusual project in the niche of database management system software which tends toward proprietary software designed for enterprise users. Proprietary database management software costs have been described as a reason for the use of Base in small businesses.

== Migration from HSQLDB to Firebird ==
Work was started in 2014 to transition the embedded storage engine from HSQLDB to the Firebird SQL back-end. Firebird has been included in LibreOffice as an experimental option since LibreOffice 4.2.

In August 2018, The Document Foundation announced the release of LibreOffice version 6.1. If the experimental mode is used, the embedded Firebird engine support is fully available, and the old HSQLDB engine is deprecated—although still available—and replaced by Firebird as the default option.

In February 2019, The Document Foundation released LibreOffice version 6.2. The embedded Firebird engine support was moved from experimental mode to operational and the Firebird Migration Assistant can create a backup copy of content as an XML document for the migration process. In February 2020, embedded Firebird was moved back to experimental mode, taking effect in version 6.4.1.
