= Calligra Words =

Word processor for KDE desktop environment

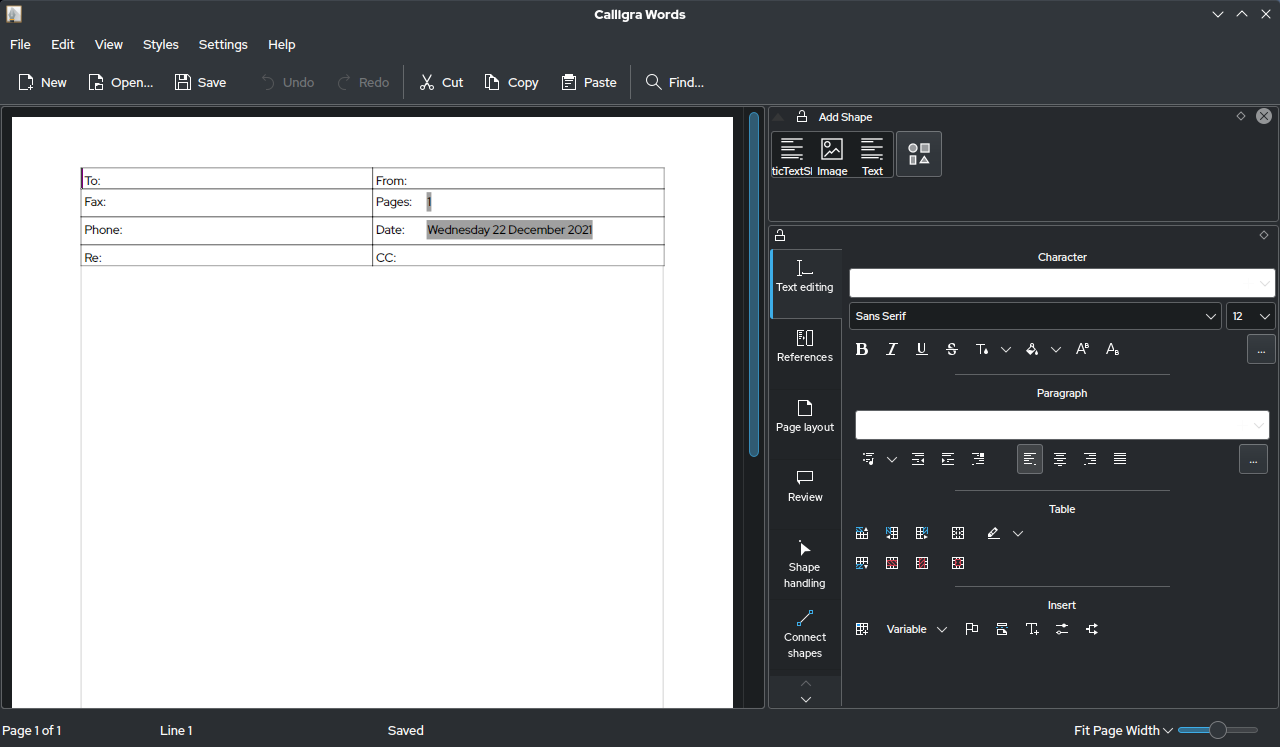
- Developer: KDE
- Initial release: April 11, 2012; 14 years ago
- Stable release: 4.0.1 / 2 September 2024
- Operating system: Unix-like, Windows
- Type: Word processor
- License: LGPL
- Website: calligra.org/words/

Calligra Words is a word processor, which is part of Calligra Suite and developed by KDE as free software.

== History ==
When the Calligra Suite was formed, unlike the other Calligra applications Words was not a continuation of the corresponding KOffice application – KWord. The Words was largely written from scratch – in May 2011 a completely new layout engine was announced. The first release was made available on April 11, 2012, using the version number 2.4 to match the rest of Calligra Suite.

In 2024, the Calligra Office suite — including Calligra Words — received a major update with the release of Calligra 4.0, which fully transitioned the suite to the Qt 6 and KDE Frameworks 6 platforms and introduced a modern user interface overhaul, including a redesigned sidebar and interface improvements for Calligra Words.

== Reception ==
Initial reception of Calligra Words shortly after the 2.4 release was mixed. While Linux Pro Magazine Online's Bruce Byfield wrote, “Calligra needed an impressive first release. Perhaps surprisingly, and to the development team’s credit, it has managed one in 2.4.,” he also noted that “words in particular is still lacking features”. He concluded that Calligra is “worth keeping an eye on”.

On the other hand, Calligra Words became the default word processor in Kubuntu 12.04 – replacing LibreOffice Writer.

== Formula editor ==
Formulas in Calligra Words are provided by the Formula plugin. It is a formula editor with a WYSIWYG interface.

== See also ==
- List of word processors
- Comparison of word processors
