= Productivity software =

Software programs that increase productivity

Productivity software (also called personal productivity software or office productivity software) is application software used for producing information (such as documents, presentations, worksheets, databases, charts, graphs, digital paintings, electronic music and digital video). Its names arose from it increasing productivity, especially of individual office workers, from typists to knowledge workers, although its scope is now wider than that. Office suites, which brought word processing, spreadsheet, and relational database programs to the desktop in the 1980s, are the core example of productivity software. They revolutionized the office with the magnitude of the productivity increase they brought as compared with the pre-1980s office environments of typewriters, paper filing, and handwritten lists and ledgers. In the United States, as of 2015, some 78% of "middle-skill" occupations (those that call for more than a high school diploma but less than a bachelor's degree) required the use of productivity software.

== Details ==
Productivity software traditionally runs directly on a computer. For example, Plus/4 model of computer contains in ROM for applications of productivity software. Productivity software is one of the reasons people use personal computers.

== Office suite ==
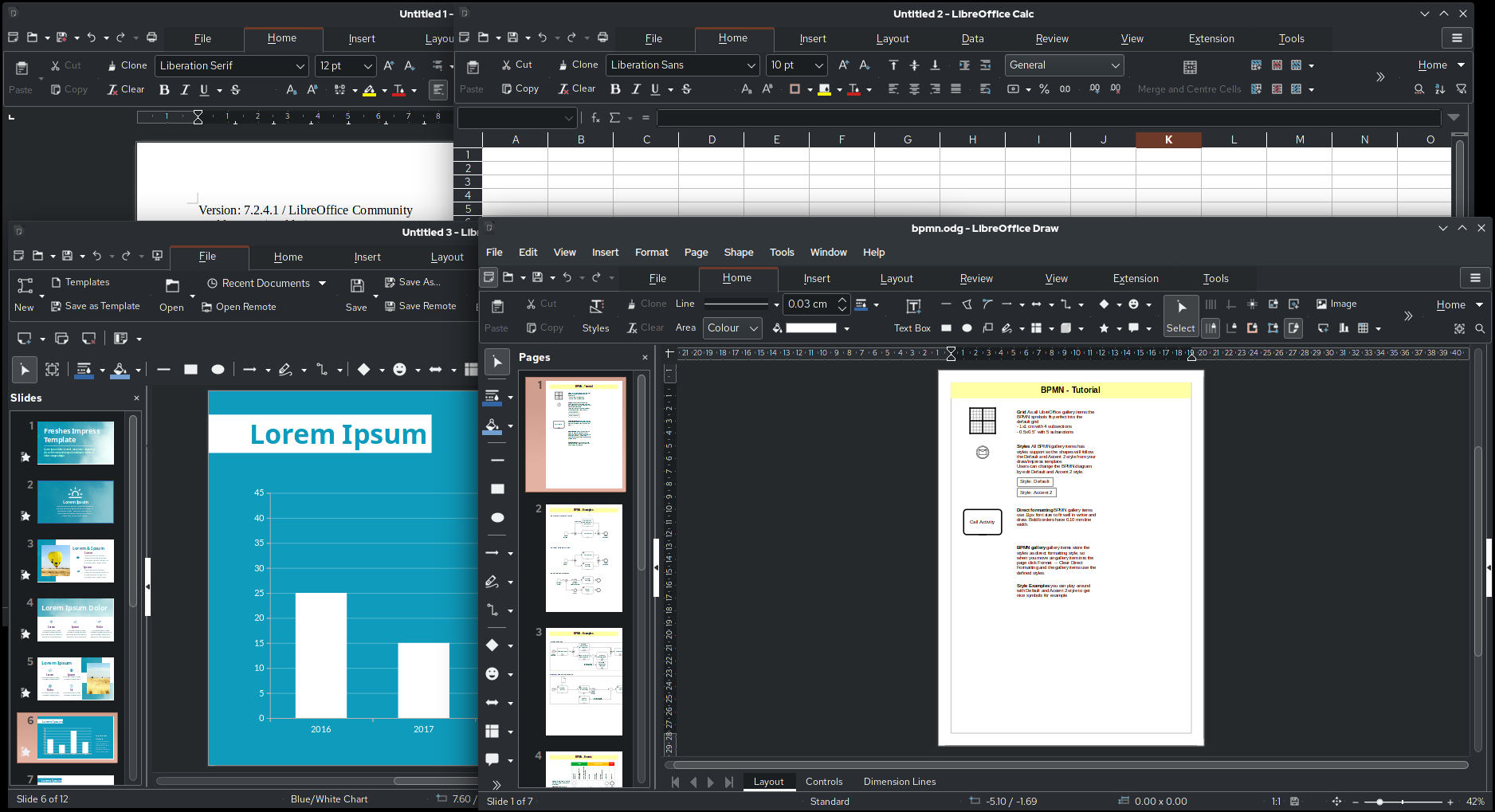
LibreOffice, an example of an office suite, showing Writer, Calc, Impress and Draw

An office suite is a bundle of productivity software (a software suite) intended to be used by office workers. The components are generally distributed together, have a consistent user interface and usually can interact with each other, sometimes in ways that the operating system would not normally allow.

The earliest office suite for personal computers was MicroPro International's StarBurst in the early 1980s, comprising the WordStar word processor, the CalcStar spreadsheet and the DataStar database software. Other suites arose in the 1980s, and Microsoft Office came to dominate the market in the 1990s, a position it retains as of 2024.

During the 1990s, office suite products gained popularity by offering bundles of applications that, when bought as part of a suite, effectively discounted the individual applications, with four or five applications being bundled for the price of two applications bought separately. When faced with such potential savings, customers could be "tempted by the suite, rather than the value of a particular product", and by 1994 more than 60 percent of the sales of Microsoft Word and around 70 percent of the sales of Microsoft Excel were as part of sales of Microsoft Office. Such considerations had an impact on vendors of individual applications, often smaller companies, raising concerns that office suites were "stifling innovation", and even established vendors such as Borland and WordPerfect were having to adapt to the suite phenomenon, Borland ultimately deciding to sell its Quattro Pro spreadsheet to WordPerfect as the latter sought to assemble its own suite product. The dominant suite vendors, Microsoft and Lotus, downplayed competition and innovation concerns, claiming that users were still able to exercise choice and that "user-driven development" was guiding the evolution of office suites. Another view was that component-based software would eventually emerge, focusing development on more specialised components used by productivity software, empowering "a plethora of third-party developers", and that a "mix and match" approach of such components would adapt to the user's way of working.

=== Office suite components ===
The base components of office suites are:

- Word processor
- Spreadsheet
- Presentation program

Other components include:

- Database software
- Graphics suite (raster graphics editor, vector graphics editor, image viewer)
- Desktop publishing software
- Formula editor
- Diagramming software
- Email client
- Communication software
- Personal information manager
- Notetaking
- Groupware
- Project management software
- Table (information)
- Web log analysis software

== See also ==
- Integrated software
- List of office suites
- List of collaborative software
- List of personal information managers
- List of PDF software
- List of software that supports Office Open XML
- List of software that supports OpenDocument
- Comparison of office suites
- Comparison of word processors
- Comparison of spreadsheet software
- Comparison of note-taking software
- Online office suite
- Online spreadsheet
- Online word processor
- Wireless clicker
