= Collabora =

Software and consulting company with open-source focus

Collabora Ltd
- Type: Private limited company
- Industry: Software; Consulting
- Founded: July 2005; 21 years ago
- Founder: Robert McQueen and Robert Taylor
- Area served: Worldwide
- Key people: Philippe Kalaf, Michael Meeks, Guy Lunardi
- Products: Collabora Online
- Number of employees: 150
- Website: collabora.com

Collabora Ltd is a private open-source software consulting company headquartered in Cambridge, United Kingdom, with an additional office in Montreal. It provides consulting, training, and product development services to organizations using open-source technologies.

Collabora is best known for developing Collabora Online, an online office suite that enables collaborative editing in a browser, and Collabora Office, a desktop office productivity software suite. Both are based on LibreOffice and marketed as open-source alternatives to proprietary platforms such as Microsoft 365 and Google Workspace. These products are developed and maintained by the company's Collabora Productivity division, which is one of the largest contributors to the LibreOffice codebase.

Originally focused on instant messaging, Voice over IP (VoIP), and videoconferencing, Collabora has since expanded into areas including multimedia, web technologies, graphics optimization, extended reality (XR), automotive infotainment, and productivity software for enterprise and government use.

In 2026, The Document Foundation revoked the foundation membership status of all Collabora representatives following legal disputes over governance.

== Products ==
- Collabora Office and Collabora Online – Branded versions of LibreOffice developed by Collabora Productivity, a major contributor to LibreOffice. The Document Foundation states most LibreOffice development is done by commercial partners like Collabora. Collabora also maintains CODE, a testbed version of LibreOffice Online.

== Projects contributed to ==
=== Operating system and infrastructure ===
- Apertis – A Debian-based infrastructure for embedded systems, mainly in automotive.
- Linux kernel – Collabora employs several kernel subsystem maintainers (e.g., Chromebooks, I3C, battery drivers) and regularly contributes to kernel releases.
- SteamOS - Collabora has collaborated with Valve Corporation on building SteamOS, especially for ARM64.
- Wayland and Weston – A display server protocol and reference compositor.

=== Communication and multimedia ===
- D-Bus – An open-source inter-process communication (IPC) system.
- Farstream and Telepathy – VoIP and collaboration frameworks created by Collabora founders, including the Empathy chat client.
- GStreamer – A multimedia framework.
- libnice – A GLib-based implementation of the ICE protocol.
- PulseAudio and PipeWire – Sound servers for Linux; WirePlumber manages PipeWire sessions.

=== Productivity and applications ===
- Monado – An open-source XR platform and OpenXR runtime for Linux.
- Pitivi – A video editor.

=== GPU-related ===
- NVK – An open-source Vulkan driver for NVIDIA hardware in Mesa, using NVIDIA’s official open headers.
- Panfrost and panthor – Open-source drivers for various Mali GPUs.
- vkmark – A Vulkan benchmarking suite with configurable scenes.
- Zink – An OpenGL implementation on top of Vulkan via Mesa Gallium.

== Participations and memberships ==
- Automotive Grade Linux – Member since 2016.
- ARM Connected Community – Member since 2014.
- Bluetooth SIG – Member since 2014.
- Cambridge Network – Member since 2005.
- Debian – Long-time community member.
- COVESA – Member since 2011.
- GNOME – Long-time community member.
- Khronos Group – Member since 2014.
- Linux Foundation – Member since 2010.
- LOT Network – Member supporting patent non-aggression.
- Open Invention Network – Licensee supporting patent non-aggression.
- Outreachy – Recurring sponsor.
- Renesas Alliance Partner since 2016.
- R-Car Consortium – Member since 2016.
- RIST Forum – Member promoting Reliable Internet Stream Transport specifications.
- Rockchip – Collaborating since 2015.
- SRT Alliance – Member promoting the Secure Reliable Transport open-source protocol.
- STMicroelectronics Partner Program – Member.
