= Soffice.exe =

soffice.exe, as the name of a process on a computer running Microsoft Windows, may refer to:

- StarOffice, a proprietary office suite which was acquired by Oracle
- OpenOffice.org, which is descended from StarOffice and is open source
- LibreOffice, a fork of OpenOffice created in 2010
- Collabora Online, runs LibreOffice Kit, with broader OS support, and enterprise level support options
