= Effenberger =

Effenberger is a German surname. Notable people with the surname include:

- Florian Effenberger, Executive Director at The Document Foundation
- Frank Effenberger, American electrical engineer
- Josef Effenberger (1901–1983), Czechoslovak gymnast
- Vratislav Effenberger (1923–1986), Czech literature theoretician
