= LibreOffice Impress =

Open source presentation program

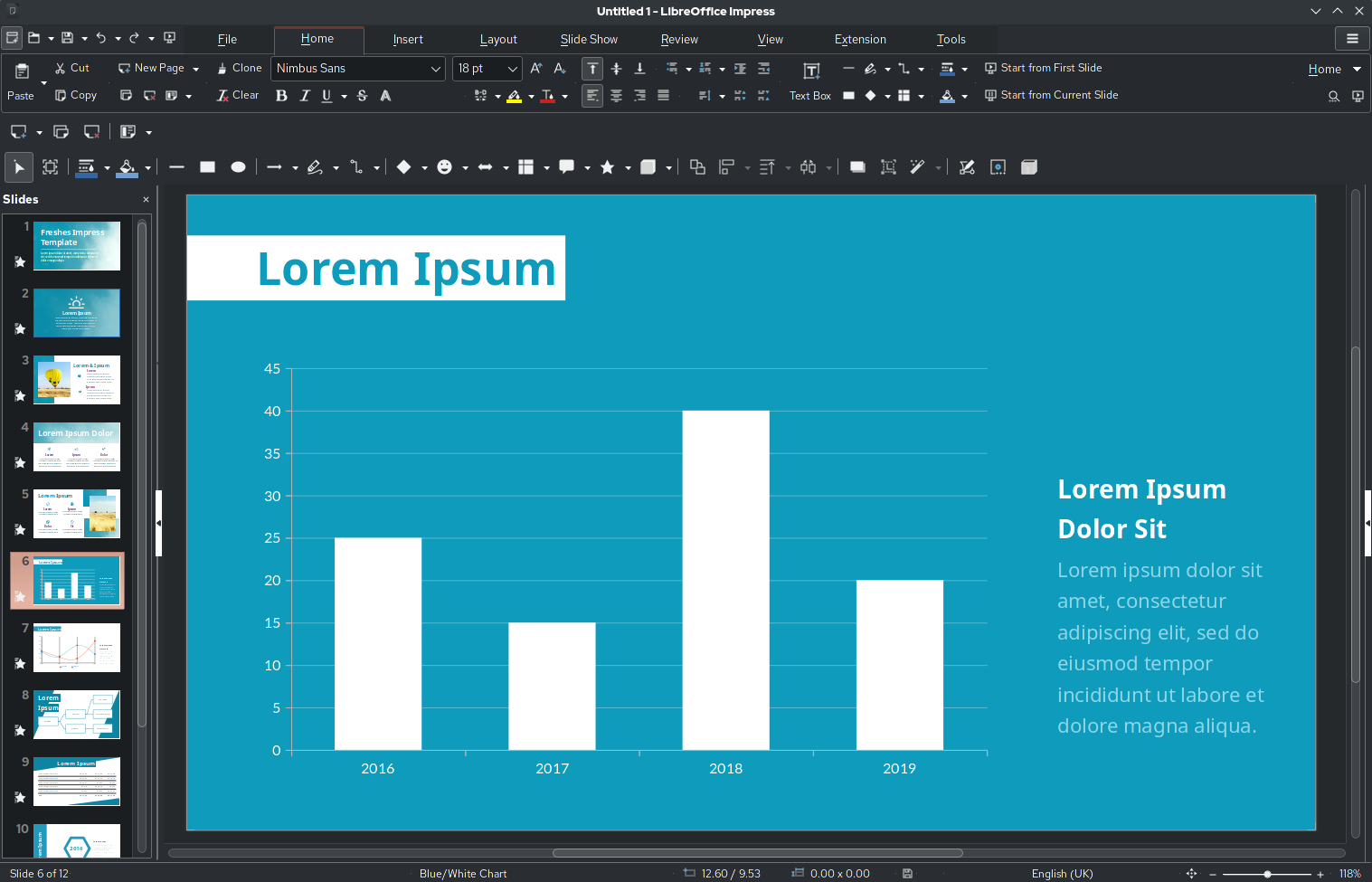
- LibreOffice Impress 7.2.4.1
- Developer: The Document Foundation
- Stable release: Fresh: 26.2.3 / 30 April 2026; Still: 25.8.6 / 26 March 2026
- Operating system: Cross platform
- Predecessor: OpenOffice.org Impress
- Type: Presentation software
- License: MPLv2.0 (secondary license GPL, LGPLv3+ or Apache License 2.0)
- Website: libreoffice.org/discover/impress

LibreOffice Impress is the presentation software component of the LibreOffice suite and a fork of OpenOffice.org Impress. It is used to create and edit presentations in the OpenDocument Presentation (ODP) format and provides functionality similar to Microsoft PowerPoint.

== Features ==
Impress supports the insertion of text, charts, images, drawing objects, and multimedia, along with animation and slide transition effects. Presentations can be exported in multiple formats, including those compatible with Microsoft PowerPoint.

The application provides several editing and viewing modes, including Normal, Outline, Notes, Handout, and Slide Sorter views. It also includes drawing and diagramming tools, Fontwork for stylized text, and support for simple 3D objects and scenes.

Slide Show mode allows control over presentation playback, including manual or timed transitions, pointer visibility, and navigation options.

Impress supports multiple monitors. It also supports the Impress Remote app for Android and iOS, which enables remote control of presentations. The Presenter Console extension provides additional controls such as speaker notes, slide previews, and timing information during delivery.
