= Marco Börries =

German IT entrepreneur and founder of Star Division, a developer of office software

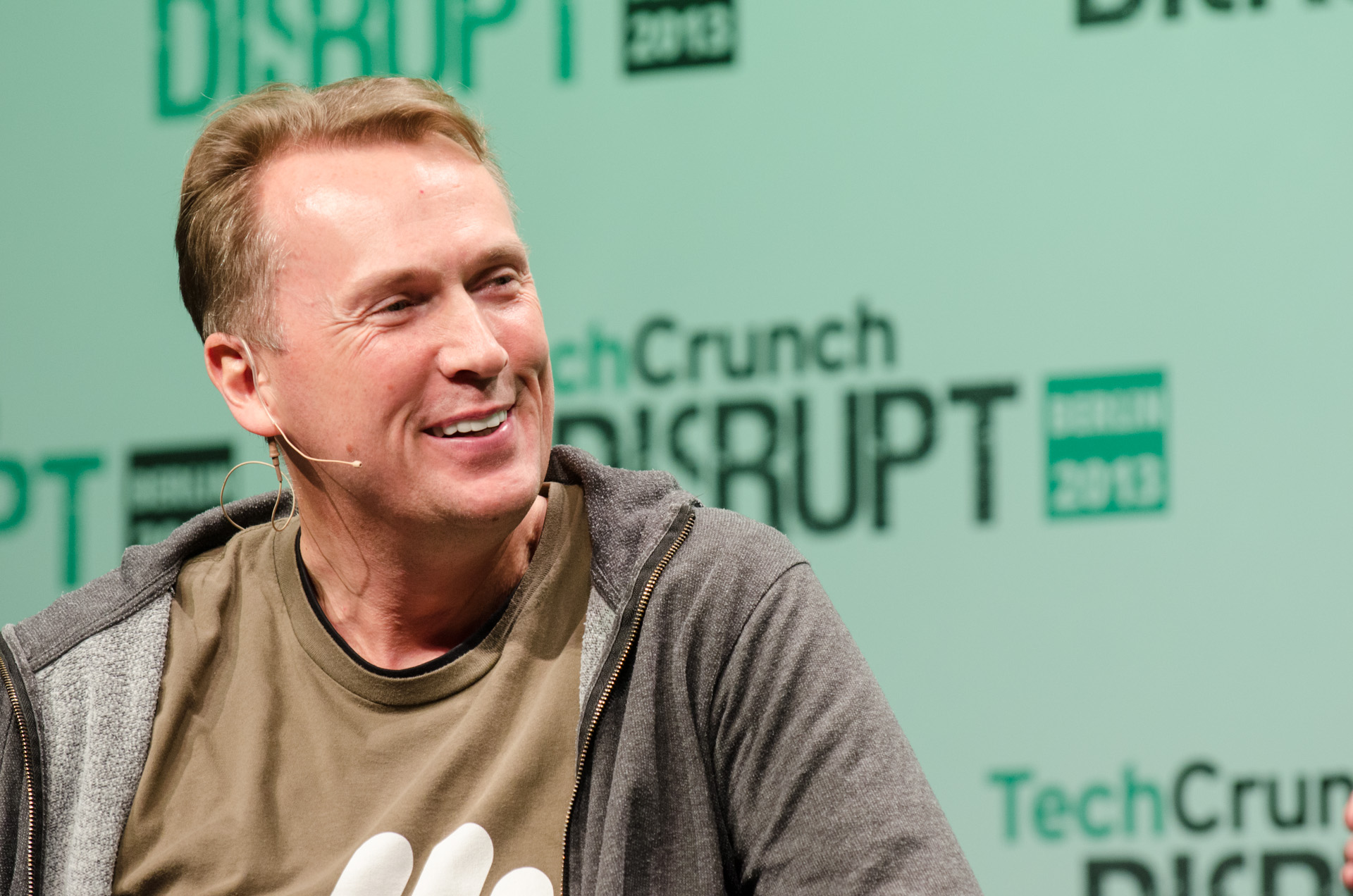
- Marco Boerries 2013 in Berlin
- Born: 1 August 1968 (age 58)
- Occupations: IT entrepreneur and executive vice president
- Known for: Star Division, StarOffice and Yahoo

Marco Boerries (born Marco Borries; 1 August 1968) is a German-American IT entrepreneur and executive vice president of Yahoo. He is best known as the founder of Star Division, who developed StarOffice, which later became OpenOffice.org.

Boerries founded Star Division at 16, launching the word processor StarWriter, which later became StarOffice, the foundation of OpenOffice and LibreOffice. He also founded Star Finanz, a home banking software provider, and later founded VerdiSoft, which developed Yahoo! Go technology. After selling VerdiSoft to Yahoo, Boerries founded NumberFour AG, providing an open software platform for small businesses under the brand name Enfore. He was also involved in other ventures like Ad hoc Mobile GmbH and Mag10 GmbH, which did not reach market entry.

== Career ==
Inspired by a student exchange program to Silicon Valley while he attended a Gymnasium in Lüneburg, Marco Boerries founded Star Division as a garage company at the age of 16. As its first product the company distributed StarWriter, a word processor application developed by friends, as an alternative to Microsoft's office package. StarWriter later became StarOffice (and thereby was the foundation to OpenOffice and LibreOffice).

StarOffice was sold over 25 million times. On 5 August 1999 Boerries sold Star Division to Sun Microsystems, where Boerries was subsequently briefly employed.

In parallel to Star Division Boerries also founded the Hamburg-based company Star Finanz as a joint venture with Deutsche Sparkassen-Organisation, a German savings bank. With StarMoney the company grew to become a significant provider of home banking software in the years following. In early 2001, Boerries sold his shares in this company as well.

In August 2001, Boerries founded VerdiSoft and served as its CEO. The company developed the Yahoo! Go technology to enable mobile phones to have screen-optimized access to emails, photos, messages and other web content. VerdiSoft including its technology know-how was sold to Yahoo in February 2005, where Boerries worked as an Executive Vice President in the Connected Life division until April 2009.

Until 2008 Boerries lived with his wife Andrea and three children in California, but then moved to Hamburg and Berlin in Germany.

On 1 September 2009, Marco Boerries launched his latest business idea, NumberFour AG, based in Berlin. The company developed an open software platform (PaaS) for the development, distribution and marketing of vertical services for small businesses. After four years of development, Boerries gathered US$38 million from financial investors in mid 2013. The company launched a platform for small business in March 2017 connecting online services, software and hardware (PoS terminals). In September 2024, insolvency proceedings were initiated against NumberFour AG. Boerries himself is reportedly under investigation on suspicion of delaying insolvency.

Other entrepreneurial activities that did not lead to market entries were Ad hoc Mobile GmbH, founded in 2009, and Mag10 GmbH, founded in 2010. This was a company to develop a service for tablet publishing, but was shelved at the end of 2011.
