= Sylk =

Sylk may refer to:

- Sylk, a character from Glitter (film)
- Symbolic Link (SYLK), a Microsoft file format typically used to exchange data between applications, specifically spreadsheets
