= StarWriter =

StarWriter can refer to:

- The Canon Inc. StarWriter, a typewriter with inkjet printhead produced by Canon.
- StarOffice Writer, the word processor module in StarOffice, formerly known as StarWriter.
