= Impress Remote =

Open-source presentation remote control app

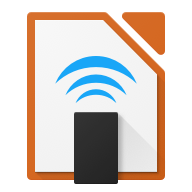

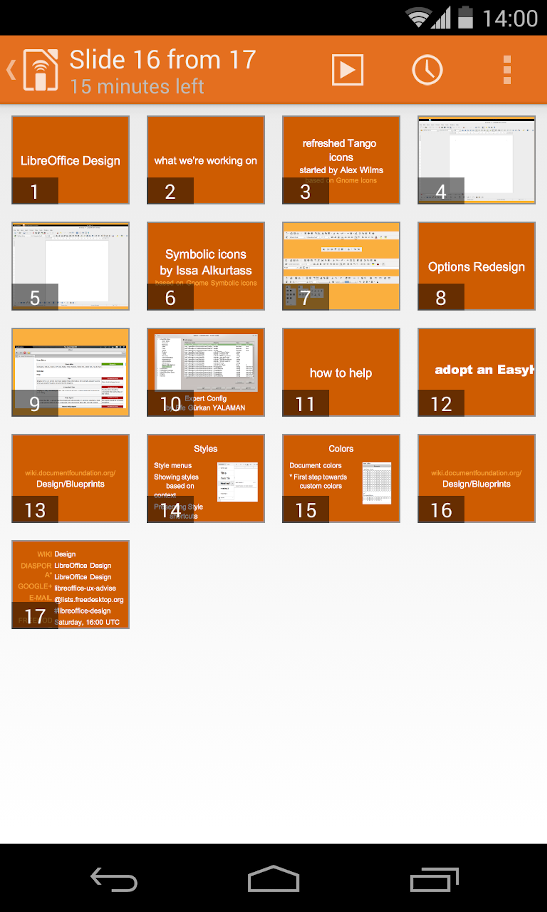
- Alternate mode: all slide thumbnails for direct selection, jumping.
- Original authors: Android: Andrzej Hunt and others, iOS: Siqi Liu
- Developer: The Document Foundation
- Release: iOS: February 2014
- Stable release: 2.6.1
- Written in: Java, Objective-C
- Operating system: Android, iOS, Pebble
- Available in: Multilingual (113)
- Type: Remote desktop software
- License: MPL v2
- Website: Official wiki

Impress Remote is an open-source mobile application for remote control of LibreOffice Impress, the presentation software component of LibreOffice. It enables users to control slideshow presentations from a mobile device, including navigation between slides, viewing speaker notes, accessing slide previews, using a timer or stopwatch, and activating a pointer or blank screen function, depending on the platform.

The Android version was developed primarily by Andrzej Hunt during the 2012 Google Summer of Code. An iOS version was developed by Siqi Liu during the 2013 Google Summer of Code and became available on the iOS App Store in February 2014.

A version for the Pebble smartwatch was released in January 2015.

In 2026, the Document Foundation released an extension for Impress offering similar functionality, without the need for a separate mobile app. This effectively rendered the app redundant, as it had not been maintained for many years and had gradually become outdated.
