= Star Division =

German software company

- Type: Gesellschaft mit beschränkter Haftung
- Industry: Computer software
- Founded: 1985; 41 years ago in Lüneburg, Germany
- Founder: Marco Börries
- Defunct: August 5, 2000; 26 years ago
- Fate: Acquired by Sun Microsystems
- Headquarters: Hamburg, Germany
- Products: StarOffice
- Number of employees: 170 (1997)

Star Division was a German software company best known for developing StarOffice, a proprietary office suite. The company was founded in 1985 by 16-year-old Marco Börries in Lüneburg, and initially operated as a small startup. Its first product was StarWriter, a word processor that later evolved into the StarOffice suite.

Positioned as a lower-cost alternative to Microsoft Office, StarOffice achieved over 25 million sales worldwide and held an estimated 25% share of the office suite market in Germany by the late 1990s. In 1998, Star Division made the software freely available for private use. The following year, on 5 August 1999, the company was acquired by Sun Microsystems for US$59.5 million, reportedly because acquiring the company was more cost-effective than licensing Microsoft Office for its employees.

Sun subsequently released StarOffice 5.1a free for commercial use and later open-sourced the software as OpenOffice.org, which served as the basis for related projects such as LibreOffice. Sun was acquired by Oracle Corporation in 2010.
