= RagTime =

Frame-oriented business publishing software

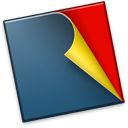
- Developer: RagTime.de Development GmbH
- Stable release: 7.0.4 / Nov. 2024
- Operating system: Windows, macOS
- Type: Desktop publishing
- License: Proprietary
- Website: www.ragtime.de

RagTime is a frame-oriented business publishing software which combines word processing, spreadsheets, simple drawings, image processing, and charts, in a single document/program, integrated software. It is often used to create forms, reports, documentation, desktop publishing, and in office environments. Typical users are business clients, educational institutions, administrations, architects, and also private users.

Ragtime includes the following modules:

- Page layout (forms, templates etc.)
- Word processing
- Image processing
- Spreadsheets, similar to Microsoft Excel
- Formulas and functions which can be used throughout, in text, graphics, and spreadsheets
- Charts in different types of diagrams
- Drawings in vector graphics including lines, polygons, Bézier curves and more
- Slide show (presentation of RagTime documents)
- Audio/video
- Buttons (pop-up menus, switches, and more) that can be used within RagTime documents
- Import/export of various file formats
- Support of the AppleScript scripting language available system-wide under macOS

== Principle ==
RagTime differs from most other comparable programs or software packages in its strict frame-oriented design: all content is contained within frames on each page. The content can have a fixed position within its frame or, if it is text or a spreadsheet, flow into another frame that is connected to the first frame via a so-called “pipeline”.

RagTime has no different document types for different types of data; all content is stored in a single compound document type. Thus, a RagTime document not only can contain multiple pages, but also multiple layouts within the same document; e.g. spreadsheets in addition to text and images.

The RagTime filename extension is .rtd (RagTime document); for templates the extension is .rtt (RagTime template).

The current version is RagTime 6.6.5. It is available for OS X (10.6-10.14) and Windows (XP/Vista/7/8/10).

== Extensions ==
- FileTime – allows accessing “FileMaker Pro” databases from RagTime documents under OS X
- RagTime Connect – ODBC database connection for RagTime 6 (Mac and Windows)
- Johannes – print extension for the simple creation of stapled or folded brochures, booklets etc.
- PowerFunctions – additional functions for a more effective creation of intelligent documents for exchanging data and for use in mixed Mac/Windows environments
- MetaFormula – SYLK-based extension that allows calculating text as formula

== History ==
RagTime has been developed since 1985 for the Macintosh – originally named MacFrame – and was published in 1986. When released, it already had the present name, which was chosen following the then-available software package Lotus Jazz.

In the European Macintosh market, RagTime quickly gained a prominent position that continues to this day, even though the market share has decreased. Despite repeated attempts, the program could not gain acceptance in the North American market due to its high cost ($395 in 1990). The North American sales office closed in 1991, shortly after Claris Corporation released ClarisWorks which duplicated much of the functionality of RagTime for a lower price.

After the manufacturer – first Brüning & Everth, followed by B&E Software and today RagTime.de Development – had focused on the Macintosh only for a very long time, it also released a Windows version, RagTime 5.0, in 1999. However, the program could not assume great significance against established competitors, especially Microsoft Office.

Until mid-2006 RagTime was, in addition to the commercial version, also available as a free version (RagTime Solo) for personal use. RagTime Solo included the same features and performance (except for spelling and Syllabification) dictionaries), but was not allowed for use in commercial environments. In other languages RagTime Solo was distributed as RagTime Privat. In a press release from July 5, 2006, RagTime announced the discontinuation of RagTime Solo: “… the RagTime Solo license conditions were often misinterpreted or deliberately flouted. Therefore we discontinued RagTime Solo, there will be no private version of RagTime 6 anymore.”

After a successful start of the RagTime 6.0 software, sales edged significantly lower in the following years. Disagreements arose among the shareholders about the continuation of the company, which filed for bankruptcy in July 2007. As a result, the rights to RagTime were taken over by the newly established company RagTime.de Development GmbH, which was responsible for the development. The sales partner RagTime.de Sales GmbH distributed the RagTime products until October 2015. Today RagTime.de Development GmbH is also responsible for sales.

The last level of development is the extensively revamped version RagTime 6.6 of 8 October 2015, which also includes new OS X features (e.g. high-resolution “Retina” displays) and supports Windows 10.

| Version | Release date | OS |
|---|---|---|
| RagTime 1 | 1986 | System 3.0 |
| RagTime 2 | 1988 | System 6 |
| RagTime 3 | 1989 | System 7 |
| RagTime 4 | 1996 | MacOS 7.5 |
| RagTime 5 | 1999 | MacOS 9 and Windows |
| RagTime 5.6 | 2003 | MacOS 9, OS X and Windows |
| RagTime 6 | 2006 | OS X (PPC) and Windows |
| RagTime 6.5 | 2009 | OS X (Intel/PPC) and Windows |
| RagTime 6.6 | 2015 | macOS (Intel) and Windows |
| RagTime 7.0 | 2023 | macOS 14 (Intel/ARM) and Windows |
| RagTime 7.0.4 | 2024 | macOS 15 (Intel/ARM) and Windows 11 |

== Programming ==
RagTime 1-3 were developed in Pascal, since version 4 the development is completely coded in C++. External programming and automation can be implemented via AppleScript on a Mac, and via OLE/COM-API (e.g. Visual Basic) under Windows.

On a Mac, RagTime provides a comprehensive AppleScript library, for the automation of almost any task, from automatic document creation to the export of PDF documents. RagTime also supports “recordings” by use of the “AppleScript Editor”, which allows recording the interactive RagTime operation as an AppleScript program sequence. AppleScripts can be saved in the RagTime document and called via menu or shortcut keys.

On Windows, RagTime (since version 6) disposes over an OLE/COM API, which allows automating many RagTime components via external programming. For that purpose there is a type library that installs the available RagTime OLE/COM object catalogue. Programming can be realized in all programming languages supported by Microsoft.
