= Florian Effenberger =

Executive Director at The Document Foundation

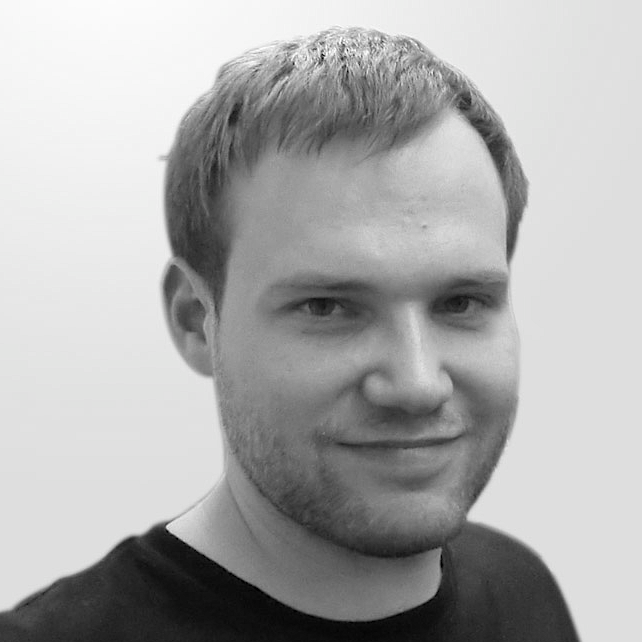
- Effenberger's picture from his personal blog
- Occupation: Executive Director at The Document Foundation
- Call sign: floeff
- Website: effenberger.org

Florian Effenberger is executive director at The Document Foundation, the legal entity behind LibreOffice.

== Career ==
He started his work on OpenOffice.org and eventually became Co-Lead of the Marketing Project in July 2007. In January 2010, Effenberger was elected Lead, a role he held until he stepped down in October 2010, in favor of his engagement with the group behind the LibreOffice fork.

Florian Effenberger is one of the founders of The Document Foundation, and one of its spokespersons. He became chairman of the board in October 2011, a role he held until February 2014.

As the founder of The Document Foundation, the association Freies Office Deutschland e.V., he holds a seat at the supervisory board and previously served in the board of directors. In December 2012 The Document Foundation announced that Effenberger is now hired. In March 2014, he was promoted executive director.

He is one of the creators of the Munich open source meetups and invented the idea of open source cooking.
