= Transglobal Secure Collaboration Participation =

Forum of defence industry organizations

- Predecessor: Transatlantic Secure Collaboration Project
- Formation: 2002
- Type: Non-profit
- Website: www.tscp.org

The Transglobal Secure Collaboration Participation, Inc. (TSCP), which sponsors the Transglobal Secure Collaboration Program, was established in 2002 as a collaborative forum of organizations in the defense industry to address security issues with collaboration. TSCP is a government and industry partnership for secure electronic transmission and sharing of sensitive information internationally.

== Description ==
The group was originally called the Transatlantic Secure Collaboration Project, based in the USA and the UK. The first phase of a framework was published by US and UK contractors by March 5, 2003. For TSCP members (which include government departments and agencies, as well as system integrators and defense manufacturers) this framework enables secure access to other members’ sensitive data by creating a collaborative environment based on trust mechanisms. TSCP’s chain of trust includes government entities and their prime contractors, as well as suppliers. Its focus expanded from secure data access to data-centric information protection, particularly as a defense against cyber threats. It is based in Vienna, Virginia, USA.

== Members ==
=== Government ===
- United States Department of Defense
- United States General Services Administration
- United States Secret Service
- NASA - National Aeronautics and Space Administration
- ANSSI - Agence nationale de la sécurité des systèmes d’information (French Agency for National Security of Information Systems)
- Ministry of Defence (Netherlands)
- Ministry of Defence (United Kingdom)

=== Industry ===
- BAE Systems
- The Boeing Company
- EADS
- Lockheed Martin
- Northrop Grumman
- Raytheon
- CA Technologies
- Microsoft
- Axiomatics
- Boldon James
- Deep-Secure
- Deloitte & Touche LLP
- Electrosoft
- Fugen Solutions
- Gemalto
- HID Global (formerly ActivIdentity)
- ID DataWeb
- Intercede
- Litmus Logic
- National Aerospace Laboratory (NLR)
- NextLabs
- Ping Identity
- Syneren Technologies Corporation
- Wave Systems Corporation
- Chevron Corporation

== See also ==
- Netherlands Atlantic Association
