= COVESA =

Automotive technology alliance

- Formation: March 2009
- Type: 501(c)(6) non profit organization
- Headquarters: San Ramon, California, United States
- Members: Automotive companies, equipment manufacturers
- Key people: Steve Crumb (Executive Director); Matt Jones (Chairman & President)
- Website: covesa.global

Connected Vehicle Systems Alliance (COVESA), formerly known as GENIVI Alliance is a non-profit automotive industry alliance that develops reference approaches for integrating operating systems and middleware present in connected vehicles and the associated cloud services. The alliance was founded as GENIVI Alliance on March 2, 2009, by BMW Group, Delphi, GM, Intel, Magneti-Marelli, PSA Peugeot Citroen, Visteon, and Wind River Systems. It rebranded as COVESA in October 2021.

== Overview ==
The industry alliance develops a common hardware and software architecture for system providers for the automotive industry. This includes Linux-based services, middleware and open application layer interfaces.

== History ==
GENIVI was announced at CeBit 2009 as a new Open Source development platform for the auto industry. Its founding members included BMW, Delphi, General Motors, Intel, Magneti Marelli, PSA Peugeot Citroën, Visteon and Wind River, and its goal was to jointly develop Linux-based infotainment software. It was incorporated as a 501(c)(6) nonprofit organization. The name GENIVI was a portmanteau of Geneva and IVI, which stood for in-vehicle infotainment. In January 2016, the organization released an Automotive Grade Linux Unified Code Base distribution featuring GENIVI components, and announced new members including Ford, Subaru, Mazda and Mitsubishi Motors. In October 2021, the organization renamed itself as the Connected Vehicle Systems Alliance (COVESA), to add an emphasis on the group's work with cloud computing and data exchange. In October 2022, the group's work with vehicle operating systems and software platforms was reviewed, categorized and presented by researchers at the International Conference on Information and Communication Technology Convergence (ICTC).

== Projects ==
The group's projects are divided into groups including the Common Vehicle Interface Initiative (CVII), the Android Automotive Special Interest Group (SIG), the Vehicle Payments Special Interest Group (SIG) and the Automotive Cybersecurity Team. Notable projects include the development of vehicle signal specifications (VSS) including related APIs for vehicle signals and service catalogs, as well as using service-oriented architecture to accelerate integration of new features into automotive systems. The group also works with the World Wide Web Consortium (W3C) Automotive Working Group, consisting of experts from vehicle manufacturers, suppliers, solution providers and researchers.
