= LibreOffice =

Free and open-source productivity software suite

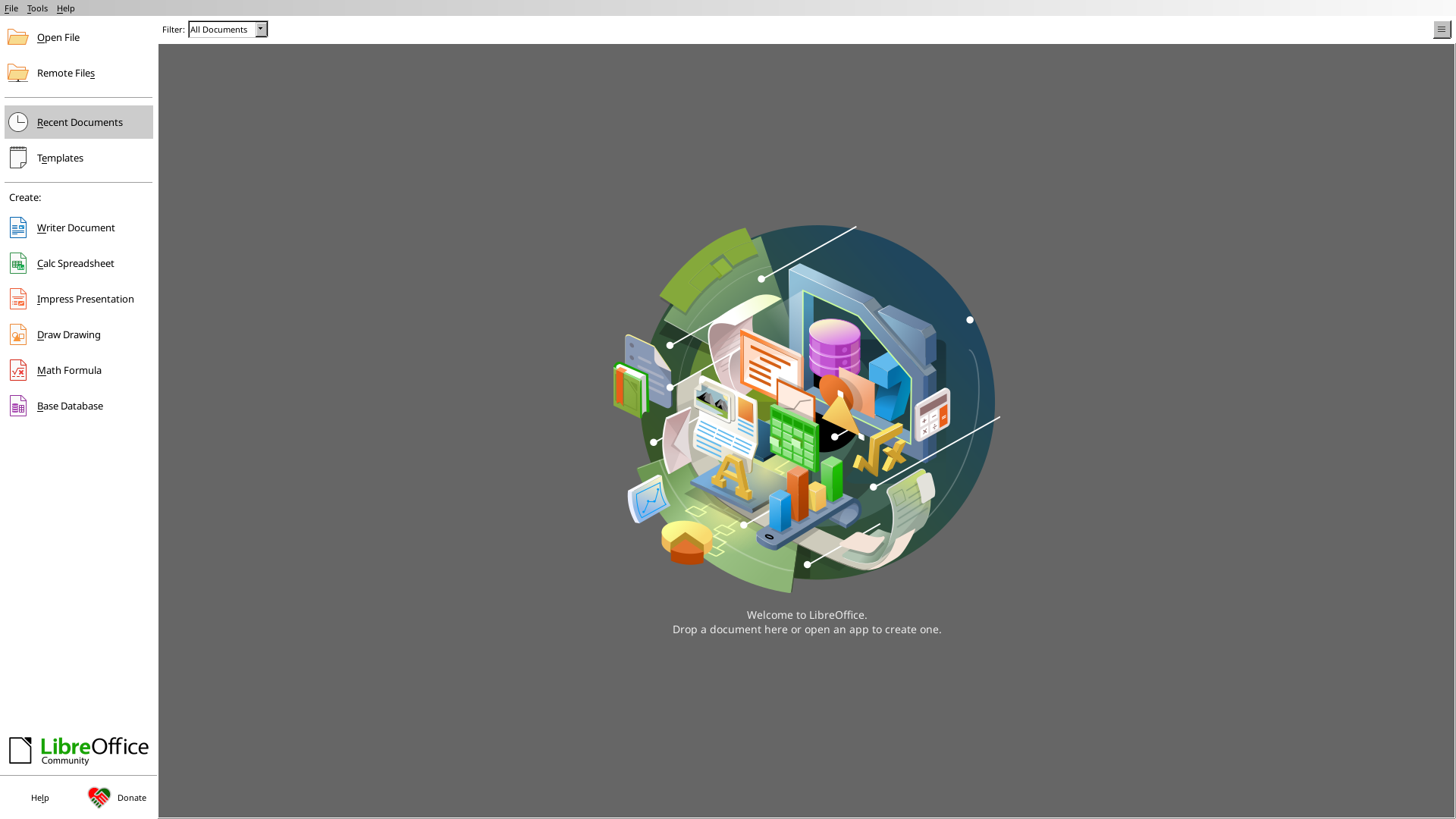
- LibreOffice 25 on Debian Trixie
- Original author: Star Division
- Developer: The Document Foundation
- Release: 25 January 2011; 15 years ago

Stable release(s)
- Still: 26.2.7 / 3 November 2026; Fresh: 26.8.3 / 12 November 2026

Preview release(s)
- 27.2.0.0.alpha0 / 16 June 2026; (master build) (Note: Master builds appear whenever the scheduled build for a given platform succeeds. In practice this means roughly daily for Linux, every one to a few days for macOS, and every one to several days for Windows.)
- Written in: C++, XML, Python, and Java
- Operating system: Linux; macOS; Windows; Unofficial: BSD; iOS; iPadOS; OpenIndiana
- Platform: ARM64; x86-64; Unofficial: ARM32; IA-32; ppc64le
- Predecessor: OpenOffice.org
- Standard: OpenDocument
- Available in: 120 languages
- Type: Office productivity suite
- License: MPL-2.0
- Website: libreoffice.org
- Repository: git.libreoffice.org

LibreOffice (/ˌliːb.rə ˈɒf.ɪs/) is a free and open-source office productivity software suite developed by The Document Foundation (TDF). It was created in 2010 as a fork of OpenOffice.org, itself a successor to the discontinued StarOffice suite. The suite includes applications for word processing (Writer), spreadsheets (Calc), presentations (Impress), vector graphics (Draw), database management (Base), and formula editing (Math). It supports the OpenDocument format and is compatible with other major formats, including those used by Microsoft Office.

LibreOffice is available for Windows and macOS, and is the default office suite in many Linux distributions, and there are community builds for other platforms such as OpenIndiana. Ecosystem partner Collabora uses LibreOffice as upstream code to provide a web-based suite branded as Collabora Online, along with apps for platforms not officially supported by LibreOffice, including Android, ChromeOS, iOS and iPadOS.

TDF describes LibreOffice as intended for individual users, and encourages enterprises to obtain the software and technical support services from ecosystem partners like Collabora. TDF states that most development is carried out by these commercial partners in the course of supporting enterprise customers. This arrangement has contributed to a significantly higher level of development activity compared to Apache OpenOffice, another fork of OpenOffice.org, which has struggled since 2015 to attract and retain enough contributors to sustain active development and to provide timely security updates.

LibreOffice was announced on 28 September 2010, with its first stable release in January 2011. It recorded about 7.5 million downloads in its first year, and more than 120 million by 2015, excluding those bundled with Linux distributions. As of 2018, TDF estimated around 200 million active users. The suite is available in 120 languages.

== Features ==
=== Included applications in LibreOffice ===
| Component | Notes |
|---|---|
| Writer | Word processor program, similar to Microsoft Word, with support for multiple file formats and WYSIWYG editing. |
| Calc | Spreadsheet program, similar to Microsoft Excel, with support for charts, formulas, and data analysis. |
| Impress | Presentation program, similar to Microsoft PowerPoint. |
| Draw | Vector graphics editor, and desktop publishing software similar to Microsoft Visio and Microsoft Publisher, also capable of basic image and PDF editing. |
| Math | Formula editor for mathematical expressions. |
| Base | Database management program similar to Microsoft Access, with support for local and external sources. |

=== Operating systems and processor architectures ===
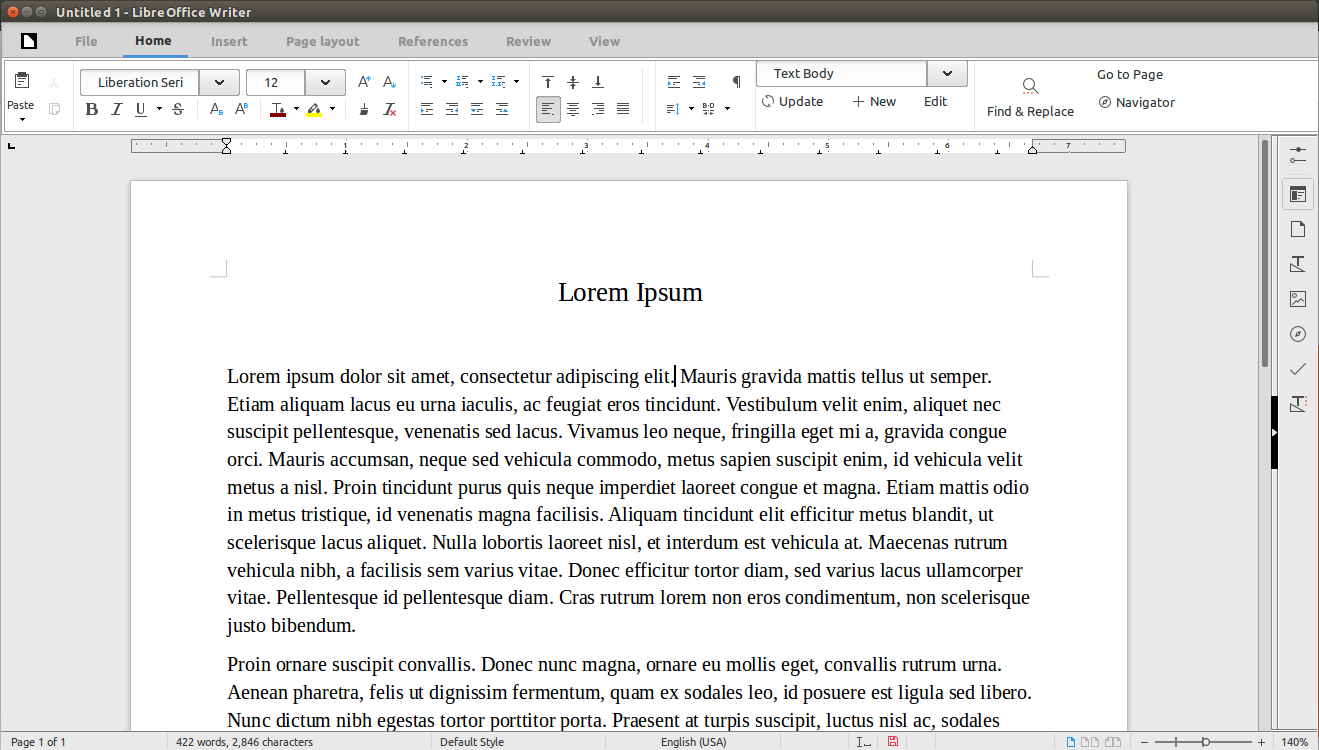
LibreOffice 5.3 Writer using the MUFFIN interface running on Ubuntu 16.04

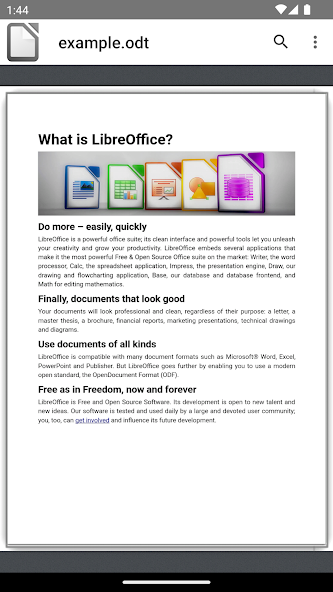
LibreOffice Viewer on Android

LibreOffice is cross-platform software. The Document Foundation officially supports Linux, macOS and Windows. Additional ports exist for other operating systems and processor architectures, maintained by commercial vendors such as Collabora or by community members, as is the case for BSD (FreeBSD, NetBSD, OpenBSD) and OpenIndiana.

Earlier versions of LibreOffice and its predecessors, including StarOffice, supported platforms such as Solaris on SPARC hardware, though these are no longer maintained.

LibreOffice development has also expanded to mobile platforms. TDF offers two mobile apps: Impress Remote for Android, iOS and iPadOS, which allows users to control presentations remotely, and a document viewer for Android. Collabora provides officially supported mobile apps with editing capabilities for Android, iOS, and iPadOS.

Summary of cross platform support
| System | Architectures | Current | Source |
|---|---|---|---|
| Android | ARM64 | Yes | Collabora Office |
| BSD (Note: Includes FreeBSD, NetBSD and OpenBSD) | ARM, IA-32, x86-64, others | Yes | Community port |
| ChromeOS (Note: Supported with an Android app that is optimized for ChromeOS.) | ARM, ARM64, IA-32, x86-64 | Yes | Collabora Office |
| iOS/iPadOS | ARM64 | Yes | Collabora Office |
| Linux | ARM64, IA-32, x86-64, ppc64le | Yes | LibreOffice, Collabora Office, community port |
| macOS | ARM64, (Note: Support for M Series of Apple silicon (such as M1, M2, etc)) x86-64 | Yes | LibreOffice, Collabora Office |
| OpenIndiana | x86-64 | Yes | Community port |
| Windows | ARM64, (Note: Support for Windows on Arm (Arm64) since version 24.8) IA-32 (deprecated), (Note: Support for 32-bit Windows systems will be discontinued starting with version 25.8) x86-64 | Yes | LibreOffice, Collabora Office |

=== LibreOffice Online ===
LibreOffice Online is the web-based version of the LibreOffice office suite, allowing users to view and edit documents through a web browser using the HTML5 <canvas> element. Development began in 2011, with contributions from Collabora and IceWarp. A preview of the software was demonstrated in 2015, and in December 2015, Collabora and ownCloud released a technical preview called Collabora Online Development Edition (CODE). The first source code release of LibreOffice Online occurred alongside LibreOffice version 5.3 in February 2017.

The Document Foundation does not plan to offer a hosted cloud solution similar to commercial offerings like Google Workspace or Microsoft 365, due to the prohibitively high cost of running the platform. Therefore, the task has been left to third-party ecosystem partners and cloud providers, like Collabora and CIB. The first enterprise version, Collabora Online 1.0, was released in July 2016. In the same month, Nextcloud partnered with Collabora to integrate CODE for its users. In 2019, CIB announced that it would offer a version, branded as "LibreOffice Online powered by CIB". TDF has expressed openness to a public LibreOffice Online service provided by a charitable organization.

=== Supported file formats ===
LibreOffice uses the OpenDocument Format (ODF) as its default file format, an international standard developed by the ISO and IEC. It can also open and save files in other formats, including those used by Microsoft Office, through a variety of import and export filters. LibreOffice also supports exporting to PDF, including "hybrid PDFs" that embed an editable ODF file within a standard PDF.

Supported file formats
| Format | Extension | Type | Read | Write | Notes |
|---|---|---|---|---|---|
| AbiWord | ABW, ZABW | Document | From 4.2 | | |
| Adobe Flash | SWF | Graphics, multimedia | Yes | Up to 6.4 (Impress / Draw only) | Support for writing the format was discontinued as Adobe Flash Player will no longer be maintained. |
| Aldus/Adobe PageMaker | PMD, PM3, PM4, PM5, PM6, P65 | Document, DTP | From 4.4 | | |
| ClarisWorks/AppleWorks | CWK | Document | From 4.1 | | |
| Adobe Swatch Exchange | ASE | Color plate | From 5.0 | | |
| Adobe FreeHand | AGD, FHD | Graphics / Vector | Yes | | |
| Apple Keynote | KTH, KEY | Presentation | From 5.0 | | |
| Apple Numbers | numbers | Spreadsheet | From 5.0 | | |
| Apple Pages | pages | Document | From 5.0 | | |
| AportisDoc (Palm) | PDB | Document | Yes | Yes | Requires Java |
| AutoCAD DXF | DXF | Graphics / CAD | Yes | | |
| BMP file format | BMP | Graphics / Raster | Yes | Yes | |
| Comma-separated values | CSV, TXT | Text | Yes | Yes | |
| ClarisDraw | | Graphics / Vector | Yes | | |
| CorelDRAW 6-X7 | CDR, CMX | Graphics / Vector | From 3.6 | | |
| Computer Graphics Metafile | CGM | Graphics | Yes | | Binary-encoded only |
| Data Interchange Format | DIF | Spreadsheet | Yes | Yes | |
| DBase, Clipper, VP-Info, FoxPro | DBF | Database | Yes | Yes | |
| DocBook | XML | XML | Yes | Yes | |
| Encapsulated PostScript | EPS | Graphics | Yes | Yes | |
| Enhanced Metafile | EMF | Graphics / Vector / Text | Yes | Yes | |
| EPUB | EPUB | eBook | | From 6.0 | |
| FictionBook | FB2 | eBook | From 4.2 | | |
| GIMP Palette | GPL | Color palette | From 4.4 | | |
| Gnumeric | GNM, GNUMERIC | Spreadsheet | From 5.1 | No | |
| Graphics Interchange Format | GIF | Graphics / Raster | Yes | Yes | |
| Hangul WP 97 | HWP | Document | Yes | No | Newer documents are not supported |
| HPGL plotting file | PLT | Graphics | Yes | | |
| HTML | HTML, HTM | Document, text | Yes | Yes | |
| Ichitaro 8/9/10/11 | JTD, JTT | Document | Yes | | |
| JPEG | JPG, JPEG | Graphics | Yes | Yes | |
| Lotus 1-2-3 | WK1, WKS, 123, wk3, wk4 | Spreadsheet | Yes | | |
| Lotus Word Pro | | Document | Yes | | |
| MacDraft | | Graphics / CAD | From 5.0 | | |
| MacDraw | | Graphics / Vector | From 4.4 | | |
| MacDraw II | | Graphics / Vector | From 4.4 | | |
| Macintosh Picture File | PCT | Graphics | Yes | Yes | |
| MacWrite Pro 1.5 | | Document | From 4.1 | | |
| Markdown | MARKDOWN, MD | Document | From 26.2 | From 26.2 | |
| MathML | MML | Math | Yes | Yes | |
| MET | MET | | Yes | Yes | |
| Microsoft Office XP/2003 XML(WordprocessingML/SpreadsheetML) | XML | Multiple formats | Yes | Yes | |
| Microsoft Excel 4/5/95 | XLS, XLW, XLT | Spreadsheet | Yes | Up to 3.6 | |
| Microsoft Excel 97–2003 | XLS, XLW, XLT | Spreadsheet | Yes | Yes | |
| Microsoft Excel Web Query File | IQY | Data sources, text | From 5.4 | No | |
| Microsoft Office 2007–2024/ Microsoft 365 Office Open XML | DOCX, XLSX, PPTX | Multiple formats | Yes | Yes | |
| Microsoft Pocket Excel | PXL | Spreadsheet | Yes | Yes | Requires Java |
| Microsoft Pocket Word | PSW | Document | Yes | Yes | Requires Java |
| Microsoft PowerPoint 97–2003 | PPT, PPS, POT | Presentation | Yes | Yes | |
| Microsoft Publisher | PUB | Document, DTP | From 4.0 | | |
| Microsoft Rich Text | RTF | Document | Yes | Yes | |
| Microsoft Word 4/5/6/95 | DOC, DOT | Document | Yes | Up to 3.6 | |
| Microsoft Word 97–2003 | DOC, DOT | Document | Yes | Yes | |
| Microsoft Word for Mac | | Document | From 4.1 | | Word 1–5.1 |
| Microsoft Word for Windows 2.0 | DOC, DOT | Document | Yes | Yes | |
| Microsoft Works | WPS, WKS, WDB | Multiple | Yes | | |
| Microsoft Write | WRI | Document | From 5.1 | No | |
| Microsoft Visio | VSD, VST, VDW, VDX, VSX, VTX, VSDX, VSDM, VSSM, VSTX, VSTM | Graphics / Vector | From 3.5 | No | Most formats supported since 4.0, VSTX support added in 25.2 |
| Netpbm format | PGM, PBM, PPM | Graphics / Raster | Yes | Yes | |
| OpenDocument | ODT, FODT, ODS, FODS, ODP, FODP, ODG, FODG, ODF | Multiple formats | Yes | Yes | |
| Open Office Base | ODB | Database forms, data | Yes | Yes | |
| OpenOffice.org XML | SXW, STW, SXC, STC, SXI, STI, SXD, STD, SXM | Multiple formats | Yes | Yes | |
| PCX | PCX | Graphics | Yes | | |
| Photo CD | PCD | Presentation | Yes | | |
| Photoshop | PSD | Graphics | Yes | | |
| Plain text | TXT | Text | Yes | Yes | Various encodings supported |
| Portable Document Format | PDF | Document | Yes | Yes | Including hybrid PDF |
| Portable Network Graphics | PNG | Graphics / Raster | Yes | Yes | |
| QuarkXPress 3–4 | QXP | Document, DTP | From 6.0 | | |
| Quattro Pro 6.0 | WB2, wq1, wq2 | Spreadsheet | Yes | | |
| RagTime for Mac | | | From 4.4 | | |
| Scalable Vector Graphics | SVG, SVGZ | Graphics / Vector | Yes | Yes | |
| SGV | SGV | | Yes | | |
| Software602 (T602) | 602, TXT | Document | Yes | | |
| StarOffice StarCalc 3/4/5 | SDC, VOR | Spreadsheet | Dropped in 4.0, added back in 5.3 | Up to 3.6 | |
| StarOffice StarDraw/StarImpress | SDA, SDD, SDP, VOR | Presentation | Dropped in 4.0, added back in 5.3 | Up to 3.6 | |
| StarOffice StarMath 3/4/5 | SMF | Math | Up to 3.6 | Up to 3.6 | |
| StarOffice StarWriter 3/4/5 | SDW, SGL, VOR | Document | Dropped in 4.0, added back in 5.3 | Up to 3.6 | |
| Star Writer graphics | SGF | Graphics | Yes | | |
| Sony Broad Band eBook | RLF | eBook | From 4.4 | | |
| SunOS Raster | RAS | Graphics / Raster | Yes | Yes | |
| SVM | SVM | Graphics / Vector | Yes | Yes | |
| SYLK | SLK | Spreadsheet, file exchange | Yes | Yes | |
| Tag Image File Format | TIF, TIFF | Graphics / Raster | Yes | Yes | |
| Truevision TGA (Targa) | TGA | Graphics / Raster | Yes | | |
| Unified Office Format | UOF, UOT, UOS, UOP | Multiple | Yes | Yes | |
| Windows Metafile | WMF | Graphics, vector, bitmap | Yes | Yes | |
| WordPerfect | WPD | Document | Yes | | |
| WordPerfect Suite 2000/Office 1.0 | WPS | Document | Yes | | |
| WriteNow 4.0 | | Document | From 4.1 | | |
| X BitMap | XBM | Graphics / Raster | Yes | | |
| X PixMap | XPM | Graphics / Raster | Yes | Yes | |
| Zoner Draw | ZMF | Graphics | From 5.3 | | |

=== User interface and customization ===
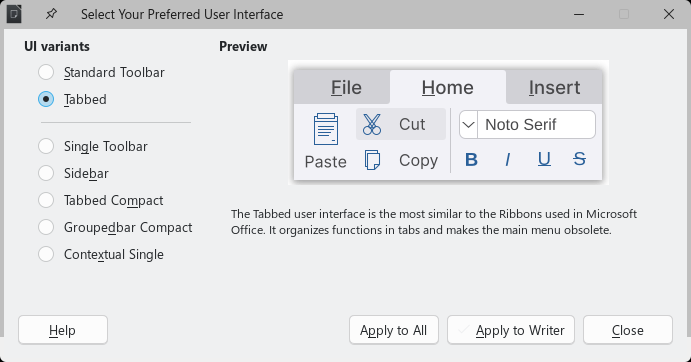
The "Tabbed" user interface variant is the most similar to the Ribbons used in Microsoft Office.

The suite offers several user interface modes, including a traditional menu and toolbar layout as well as a "Tabbed" option that mimics the ribbon interface found in Microsoft Office. LibreOffice includes multiple icon themes to adapt its look and feel to that of its desktop environment, such as Colibre for Windows and Elementary for GNOME, and integrates with native UI frameworks like GTK and Qt (both on Linux), Windows, MacOS for consistent appearance.

LibreOffice supports a range of advanced typographic features through its use of OpenType, Graphite, and Apple Advanced Typography font technologies. Text rendering on Linux systems uses the Cairo graphics library, and complex text layout is handled by the HarfBuzz engine. On Linux, support for multimedia in presentations, such as audio and video playback, is provided via the GStreamer framework.

LibreOffice supports several scripting and programming languages, including LibreOffice Basic, Python, Java, and C++, which can be used to create macros or integrate with external applications. LibreOffice Basic, which is similar to Microsoft's Visual Basic for Applications (VBA), is used primarily for automating tasks within Writer, Calc, and Base.

=== Licensing ===
LibreOffice is licensed under a dual LGPLv3 (or later) and MPL 2.0 model, which allows flexibility for future license upgrades. The project continues efforts to rebase legacy code inherited from OpenOffice.org to ensure licensing compatibility.

== History ==
A timeline of major derivatives of: StarOffice and OpenOffice.org
LibreOffice

=== Background ===
LibreOffice traces its origins to OpenOffice.org, an open-source office suite that itself was based on StarOffice, a proprietary productivity software suite developed by German company Star Division beginning in 1985. In August 1999, Star Division was acquired by Sun Microsystems for US$59.5 million (equivalent to US$115 million in 2025), reportedly because the acquisition was less expensive than licensing Microsoft Office for Sun's 42,000 employees. In July 2000, Sun announced it would release the source code of StarOffice as an open-source project, which became known as OpenOffice.org (styled with a ".org" to avoid trademark conflicts). The code was made available in October 2000, a public preview was released in October 2001, and OpenOffice.org 1.0 was officially released in May 2002.

From the outset, Sun stated that OpenOffice.org would eventually be governed by an independent foundation. However, community members expressed concerns about Sun's continued control of the project, especially as the company's involvement diminished over time, and was slow to accept patches or external contributions.

To address some of these concerns, in 2003 the Linux software company Ximian began maintaining a patch set known as ooo-build, led by Michael Meeks. The project aimed to simplify building OpenOffice.org on Linux and incorporate community-submitted enhancements that had not been accepted by Sun. In 2007, Novell, which had acquired Ximian, launched a fork of OpenOffice.org called Go-oo, which integrated the ooo-build patches, added additional features, and adopted more permissive policies toward external contributions. Many of these changes foreshadowed those later implemented in LibreOffice. However, many free software advocates remained concerned that the Go-oo project was being controlled by another for-profit corporation.

In early 2010, Sun was acquired by Oracle Corporation, prompting increased concern among contributors due to Oracle's handling of other open-source projects, including a lawsuit against Google over its use of Java in the open-source Android operating system, and the close-sourcing of the OpenSolaris operating system. These concerns, combined with a withdrawal of Oracle developers from OpenOffice.org, led to increased discussion about forking the project.

=== The Document Foundation and LibreOffice ===
On 28 September 2010, members of the OpenOffice.org community announced the formation of The Document Foundation (TDF), an independent organization to continue the development of OpenOffice.org under a more open and inclusive governance model. Alongside the announcement, TDF introduced a fork of OpenOffice.org named LibreOffice.

TDF invited Oracle Corporation, then the steward of OpenOffice.org, to participate in the new foundation and donate the OpenOffice.org trademark. Oracle declined, leading TDF to adopt the LibreOffice name permanently. Major contributors to OpenOffice.org, including Novell, Red Hat, Canonical, and Google, shifted their support to the new project.

In April 2011, Oracle announced it would discontinue commercial development of OpenOffice.org and transition the project to a community-based model. Two months later, Oracle donated the codebase and trademarks to the Apache Software Foundation (ASF), where the project was renamed Apache OpenOffice.

Meanwhile, LibreOffice continued to develop rapidly under the stewardship of TDF. It incorporated features from Go-oo and other community-maintained patches, and became the default office suite in many Linux distributions, while also expanding its presence on Windows and macOS. LibreOffice receives regular updates, including new features and security fixes. According to TDF, most development is performed by ecosystem partners such as Collabora, who provide enterprise support and services around LibreOffice.

This commercial support model has contributed to higher development activity compared to Apache OpenOffice, which has struggled since 2015 to attract and retain contributors, and to issue timely security updates.

In a 2011 interview with LWN.net, Ubuntu founder Mark Shuttleworth expressed criticism of TDF, asserting that its refusal to adopt Oracle's Contributor License Agreement had undermined the OpenOffice.org project. In response, former Sun Microsystems executive Simon Phipps argued that Oracle's decision to end development was a business move unrelated to LibreOffice's creation. LibreOffice is now widely regarded as the most actively maintained and widely used successor to OpenOffice.org.

== Versions ==
Since version 4.2.2, released in March 2014, LibreOffice has offered two concurrently maintained major versions in addition to development versions (such as release candidates and nightly builds). These versions are intended to accommodate different user needs:

- Fresh – the most recent major version, which includes the latest features and improvements. It may contain bugs that have not yet been addressed.
- Still – the previous major version, which has received additional bug fixes and is recommended for users prioritizing stability. Was previously called the Stable version.

Since January 2024, beginning with version 24.2.0, LibreOffice adopted a calendar-based versioning scheme. Version numbers follow a three-part format (year.month.patch), with the year and month reflection the initial or future launch date.

=== Release schedule ===
LibreOffice follows a time-based release schedule, with major versions released approximately every six months, typically in February and August. These release months are synchronized with other free software projects (such as GNOME) and are scheduled at least one month ahead of major Linux distribution releases.

Minor "patch" updates are issued regularly for both the Fresh and Still versions to address bugs and security vulnerabilities. The Fresh version receives updates every four to six weeks until it transitions to the Still version with the release of a new Fresh version. Once designated as Still, it continues to receive updates every six to seven weeks. A version reaches its end of life roughly nine months after its initial release.

=== Enterprise and derivative versions ===
Commercial distributions of LibreOffice with service-level agreements are provided by partner organizations, the most significant of which is Collabora. Since version 7.1, the standard open-source release has stated that it is intended for "home users, students and non-profits," to distinguish it from enterprise-targeted versions. The Document Foundation recommends that organizations use commercially supported versions to help sustain development and has expressed concern that enterprise use of the community edition can divert volunteer resources and limit project funding.

Several derivative or enterprise-focused versions of LibreOffice have been developed, including:

- Collabora Office and Collabora Online are enterprise-focussed editions of LibreOffice supporting online, mobile and desktop devices. And providing long-term support, technical support, custom features, and Service Level Agreements (SLA)s.
- NDC ODF Application Tools – provided by Taiwan's National Development Council (NDC), and used by government agencies to promote OpenDocument format (ODF) standards.
- NeoOffice – macOS-focused derivative that incorporated LibreOffice code starting in 2017, having previously been based on OpenOffice.org. NeoOffice was discontinued in 2024.
- OxOffice – developed to enhance support for the Chinese language and originally based on OpenOffice.org before transitioning to LibreOffice.
- OffiDocs – developed by OffiDocs Group in Estonia, provides LibreOffice-based applications in a browser and as mobile apps.
- ZetaOffice – developed by Allotropia, is a paid enterprise version offered as both a desktop application with long-term support and a web-based version using WebAssembly.

In the 2020s, the number of commercial partner organizations decreased. In June 2023, Red Hat announced it would no longer maintain LibreOffice packages in future releases of Red Hat Enterprise Linux. Maintenance of LibreOffice packages for the related Fedora Linux was transitioned to the Fedora LibreOffice Special Interest Group. In 2021, CIB spun off its LibreOffice development and support services into a new company, Allotropia. In May 2025, Collabora announced the acquisition of Allotropia, intending to combine Allotropia's ZetaOffice and WebAssembly with its own Collabora Office and Collabora Online products.

=== Release history ===
Legend:
Unsupported
Supported
Latest version
Preview version

| Version | Release date | Notes |
|---|---|---|
| 3.3 beta | 28 September 2010 | Initial release based on OpenOffice.org and ooo-build |
| 3.3 | 25 January 2011 | First version to introduce features unique to LibreOffice: SVG image import; Enhanced import filters for Lotus Word Pro, Microsoft Works, WordPerfect and PPTX charts; Bundled extensions, such as Presenter View in Impress; Colour-coded document icons; Support for loading and saving ODF documents in flat XML format; AutoCorrect now matches the case of replaced words; Improved RTF export; Support for embedding standard PDF fonts |
| 3.4 | 3 June 2011 | New features included: Memory usage improvements; Improved speed in Calc, better Microsoft Excel compatibility, redesigned Move/Copy Sheet dialog; Improved GTK+ theme integration and font rendering in Linux; Code cleanup: German comments translated to English, dead code removed; Reduced dependence on Java and continued migration to GNU Make |
| 3.5 | 14 February 2012 | New features included: Import support for Microsoft Visio (.vsd) files; Native PostgreSQL database driver; Java 7 compatibility; AES encryption for ODF documents; Windows Installer package available; Improved Office Open XML support; Introduction of an online update checker (by default, this feature is not fully automated) |
| 3.6 | 8 August 2012 | This was the final version to support the Windows 2000 operating system. New features included: Support for color scales and data bars in Calc; Word count displayed in the status bar; Option to add watermarks in PDF export; Ten new master pages for Impress; Import support for Microsoft Office SmartArt; Import filter for CorelDRAW documents |
| 4.0 | 7 February 2013 | New features included: Import/export support for native RTF math expressions; Import filters for Microsoft Publisher and all versions of Visio files (Visio 1.0 to 2013); Improved load times for XLSX files and various DOCX enhancements; Added support for CMIS; Integration of Firefox Personas; PDF import, Presenter Console, and Python scripting provider made core features; Writer gained support for comments on text ranges |
| 4.1 | 25 July 2013 | New features included: Sidebar; Improved image rotation; Gradient backgrounds; Embedding fonts in documents; Import large HTML documents with more than 64,000 table cells; Import/export of charts to ODC files and export to various vector formats; OOXML and RTF bugfixes and enhancements; Basic implementation of EMF+ metafiles; Import of legacy Mac text formats (Write Now, MacWrite Pro, AppleWorks); Layout via Core Text for OSX and HarfBuzz for Linux |
| 4.2 | 30 January 2014 | New features included: Calc performance improvements and OpenCL for calculations via the graphics card; Start Center with file lists; New set of monochrome icons, "Sifr"; Import filter for Apple Keynote and AbiWord files; IAccessible2 (IA2) in Windows version; Embedded Firebird database engine for Base (experimental) |
| 4.3 | 30 July 2014 | New features included: Brand new drawingML-based DOCX import/export filter for shapes and TextFrames; Improved PDF import; Improved handling of Microsofts's Office Open XML format; Non-printing characters are displayed in a different color; Paragraphs in Writer can now be over 65,536 characters (up to 2 GB); The default icon set has been updated; Toolbar background is now rendered natively on Mac OS X; Comments can be printed in the margins; Data fields in Calc pivot tables can now be set to columns; Presentations can have OpenGL 3D objects |
| 4.4 | 29 January 2015 | New features included: Sidebar now enabled by default in Writer, Calc and Draw; Possibility of connection directly to OneDrive and SharePoint 2010/2013 directly from LibreOffice; Allowing Draw to import PageMaker files; The ability to digitally sign PDF files in Windows; Toolbar buttons in Writer, Calc, Impress and Draw have been reorganized and improved; New color selector: Shows recently used document colors; Support for different color palettes and for .gpl GIMP palette format; Allows directly opening the color picker and choose another color; Added the ability to import files from MacDraw, MacDraw II and RagTime for Mac (v. 2–3) in Draw and Writer; Firefox Themes improvements; Added new fonts: Caladea and Carlito |
| 5.0 | 5 August 2015 | New features included: Writer: Sidebar previews styles as formatted (;pictured;); Emoji support in 22 languages, including shortcodes for symbols and numerous other replacements; :keyboard: becomes ⌨; Images can be cropped; Text highlighting and shading compatible with MS Word; Improved import of comments (annotations) for text ranges in binary .doc files; Equations in early RTF and DOC formats imported as editable math objects; Apple Pages '09 or older import.; Calc: Added UI to conditional formatting; Improvements to scientific formatting of cells; Import of Lotus 1-2-3 (.wk3 and .wk4), Quattro Pro (.wq1 and .wq2), and Apple Numbers '09 or earlier (basic spreadsheets for ;Numbers;).; Math: Equations and their parts can be given 15 basic colors (;see picture;).; Draw: Import of MacDraft (v1) and ClarisDraw files.; Core and filters: When e-mailing, maintain document invisible content; PDF export supports Time-Stamp Protocol (RFC 3161); MS Works import: Add dialog to ask for text encoding; Support for Adobe Swatch Exchange (.ase) color palettes; LibreOffice Expert Configuration now searchable. |
| 5.1 | 10 February 2016 | New features included: Writer: A Styles menu has been added to the main menus.; Calc: A Sheet menu has been added to the main menus.; Impress: A Slide menu has been added to the main menus.; Math: The Math module now has a new item "Import MathML from Clipboard".; Core and filters: Support Unicode character input with Alt+X on Windows; PNG export in Writer, Calc and Impress; Import of the following formats supported: Gnumeric, Microsoft Write, Apple Keynote 6 |
| 5.2 | 3 August 2016 | New features included: Writer: New drawing tools; New button for showing/hiding track changes toolbar; Single Toolbar Mode; Calc: New drawing tools; Pressing ⇧ Shift+Return in the multiline input to insert a new line; Single Toolbar Mode; Option to delete border from adjacent cells too in the borders tab of "Format Cells" dialog; Freeze Rows and Columns button became a split button and added "Freeze First Row" and "Freeze first Column" options in that button; Extensive function tooltips; Impress: Quick access to slide and page properties in a new 'Slide' and 'Page' content panel in the 'Properties' sidebar tab; Exporting to PDF only notes pages; Filters: Better import of DOCX and RTF linked graphic into LibreOffice Writer; Import of Microsoft Word for DOS files; GUI: Print to File available within the list of printers in Print dialog; Video clips, charts and OLE objects will resize proportionately by default; Improved resizing behavior for images, videos and OLE objects; Simplification of Character spacing; "Save as Template" is now available in the Save toolbar button dropdown; Added Find Previous button; Added Icon View and buttons for switching between modes at Remote Files dialog, as well as supporting Google Drive's Two-Factor Authentication (2FA); New user interface for Template Manager |
| 5.3 | 1 February 2017 | Type 1 font support dropped. New features included: Writer: New dialog for quickly jump to another page; Implement table styles; New drawing tools for arrows; A toolbar button for small capitals; Calc: New drawing tools for arrows; Improve saving WEEKNUM field behavior to ODF; New options for fraction number formats; Median is added to functions available in pivot tables; New option for merging non empty cells; Impress: Images inserted via Photo Album can be linked in the document; Slide properties content panel in sidebar for master slide mode; Opening Template Selector at startup; Draw: New arrow endings, including Crow's foot notation's ones.; Base: Upgrade Firebird to version 3.0.0; Text Layout: New cross-platform text layout engine that uses HarfBuzz for consistent text layout on all platforms, also improved text layout on macOS and Windows.; Improved and consistent calculation of inter-line spacing across platforms; Enable vertical "left to right" block direction for traditional Mongolian and Manchu; Filters: Multiple improvements in Open XML, PDF and DOC filters; StarOffice StarWriter, StarCalc and StarDraw/StarImpress files can again be imported; GUI: Revamped the Extension Manager dialog; Redesign of the Colors, Gradients, Hatching and Bitmap tabs and the addition of a Pattern tab; Introduction of the Page Deck in the sidebar in Writer; Added "Import Bitmap" functionality to the Area Content Panel found in the Properties deck; Added Styles Preview checkbox functionality to the Styles & Formatting Sidebar Deck; Introduction of the new "Media Playback Panel" found in Properties deck when Media is selected; Introduction of the "Default Shapes Panel" in the new Shapes Deck for Draw; Online: First source code release of LibreOffice Online; Experimental features: Added four toolbar modes to make it easy for users to switch the visible toolbars |
| 5.4 | 28 July 2017 | New features included: Writer: Importing AutoText from Microsoft Word DOTM templates; Preserving full structure of numbered and bulleted lists while exporting or pasting them as plain text; Creating custom watermarks via Format menu; New context menu items have been added for working with sections, footnotes, endnotes and styles; Calc: Adding support for pivot charts, which use data from pivot tables. When the table is updated, the chart is automatically updated as well.; Menu commands to show, hide and delete all comments; Priority of conditional formatting rules can be changed with new up/down buttons; Extra sheet protection options have been added, to optionally allow insertion or deletion of rows and columns; CSV export settings are now remembered; Impress & Draw: Allowing specify fractional angles while duplicating an object; Core: A new standard colour palette has been included, based on the RYB colour model; Support OpenPGP keys for signing ODF documents on Linux; Added support for ECDSA keys on Linux and macOS; Signature status showing with colored infobars; Filters: File format compatibility has been improved with better support for EMF vector images; Using PDFium to render imported PDF files; Online: Responsive design and read-only mode for the document iframe added; Performance and rendering improvements; This was the last version to support the Windows XP and Vista operating system. |
| 6.0 | 31 January 2018 | New features included: Writer: Add Form menu in menubar; Input field behavior improves; Implement rotation of images to any angle; Use ODT and XLSX files as mail merge data source; New default table style; "Grammar By" spell checking; Calc: Export cell range selection or a selected group of shapes (images) to PNG or JPG; The text/plain Unformatted text format results in unquoted/unescaped content as expected for external pastes; Added "Paste unformatted text" command; New command to select unprotected cells on protected or unprotected sheet; Lock symbol to mark protected sheet; Added three new ODFF1.2 compliant functions; English syntax keywords for number format; "Styles" entry in the main menu; Impress: Better UI for handling layer attributes; Added 10 new Impress templates; Slide format defaulting to 16:9 screen; Core and filters: Addition of Noto fonts and some additional Arabic and Hebrew fonts; Cross platform support for OpenPGP document signing and encryption; TSCP-based classification for ODF and OOXML formats; Option to save images modified in place; Visualization of borders for tables; New filters to import from QuarkXPress 3–4 and export to EPUB; Various improvements to OOXML, EMF+, ODF, XHTML, Adobe Freehand, Pagemaker, publisher, Visio, FictionBook, Abiword, Apple Keynote, Pages, Numbers, Quattro Pro filters; GUI: Insert Special Characters button become drop-down list, Special characters dialog was also reworked; Added elementary icon theme; Reworked Customize dialog; Added Groupedbar Full and Tabbed Compact interfaces |
| 6.1 | 8 August 2018 | New features included: Writer: Multiple improves for Ruby characters; Support generating signature line via Insert menu; Add localized settings for tab scopes and caption order; Multiple improves to EPUB export; Calc: Sorting images anchored to Calc cells; Draw: Added New Page menu item; Base: HSQLDB database engine is still used by default, but Firebird engine is used by default when experimental mode is turned on.; Core / General: New default order for Traditional and Simplified Chinese fonts; Reworked Areafill backgrounds; New RYB Standard palette, based on Itten RYB color ring theory providing Red, Yellow, Blue primaries; New set of default gradients; New application icons; Colibre and Karasa Jaga icon themes added |
| 6.2 | 7 February 2019 | New features included: Writer: Copy and paste spreadsheet data directly in an existing table; UTF-8 and UTF-16 text file can be saved without byte order mark (BOM); Calc: Support Signature Line in the spreadsheet; Data Validation supports custom formulas; Do multivariate regression analysis via regression tool; Add the REGEX function to match or replace text with regular expression; Impress and Draw: Multiple improvements on animation; Add a couple of text related drawing styles; Add Table submenu to menu Format in Draw; Base: Embedded Firebird database engine becomes available in public; Firebird Migration Assistant creates a backup copy of content for migration; MySQL C++ connector is replaced with MariaDB C connector; BASIC: Add fully support for Firebird RDBMS; Core / General: Signing Signature Lines with an image of handwritten signature; Add Source Serif Pro font; Filters: Add support for exporting OOXML gradient, bitmap and pattern properties for chart; Implement OOXML agile encryption; GUI: Notebookbar becomes available in public; Add three SVG based icons styles; Added Minimum and Maximum labels for some conditions in Conditional formatting dialog; Add a dialog to switch font feature |
| 6.3 | 8 August 2019 | New features included: Writer: AutoCorrect exception list function has been extended to avoid auto-capitalization in words like mRNA, iPhone, fMRI; Add "Send Outline to Clipboard" button to Navigator → Context Menu; New bottom-to-top, left-to-right writing direction in table cells and text frames; Support importing charts from DOCX drawingML group shapes; New interface add Word form controls; Calc: New UNO API to let cell anchored graphics resize with the cell; New Russian ruble currency symbol (₽) to currency formats; New drop-down widget into formula bar instead old tool Sum; New checkbox to trim input range to the actual data content; Add With replacement and Keep order checkboxes for Sampling; FOURIER() function to computes discrete Fourier transform [DFT] of an input array; Impress and Draw: Various improvements for importing SmartArt from PPTX files; Base: Firebird Migration Assistant is enabled by default; Chart: Add palette selection to options charts default colors; Math: Introduce attributes harpoon and wideharpoon for an alternative representation of vectors; Core / General: LibreOffice TWAIN module can work on both 32-bit and 64-bit on Windows; New UNO command to insert narrow no-break space via keyboard shortcut; Tip-Of-The-Day dialog shows useful information once per day on startup; What's-New infobar pointing to the release notes after update; Sentence selection (triple click) is available for keyboard customization; Support redacting documents; Support Apple Advanced Typography (AAT) outside macOS; Filters: Various improvements on EMF+, PDF and OOXML filters; GUI: Tabbed Compact UI is available in public; Contextual Single UI is available in public; This version removed support for Firefox personas. |
| 6.4 | 29 January 2020 | New features included: Writer: Option to mark comments as resolved in Writer; The bottom-to-top, left-to-right text direction is available in Writer Text Frames; Comments on Writer images and charts; New Paste Special menu options for pasting table data into tables; Calc: The columns/rows headers are drawn flat now; Password length no longer limited to 15 symbols for XLSX files; Whole Sheet Export setting of the PDF export options; Impress & Draw; Added 'Remove Hyperlink' to context menu; Added 'Consolidate Text' to combine multiple selected textboxes into one; Interaction now only executed in presentation mode; Image Maps now respect the setting to require Ctrl+Click to follow the hyperlink; Hyperlink in Image Maps now work in presentation mode; Base: Access2Base API for Base users can be invoked from Python; BASIC: Implement Save As Word 2000 and Save As for Word.VBA document; Core / General: Internal Paths are now displayed in the UI; Added checkbox to enable/disable sending crash reports to The Document Foundation; Hyperlink context menus were unified; Added QR Code Generator; GUI: Document thumbnails at the Start Center have an icon overlaid to indicate the module; Added Table panel to Writer's Sidebar |
| 7.0 | 5 August 2020 | New features included: Writer adds padded numbering in lists, semi-transparent text support, and experimental support for an accessibility checker tool and PDF/UA export.; Calc adds support for TEXT() function with empty format strings and faster XLSX opening with many images.; Impress & Draw add semi-transparent text support, faster typing in animated lists, faster table editing, and fixed subscript/superscript positioning.; Base adds evaluation of macro signatures on document load.; Math adds RGB personalized color and Laplace symbol.; Core replaces Cairo graphics with Skia library, adds glow effect on objects, and enhances Navigator with context menus, outline tracking, section tooltips, and improved navigation controls.; Filters add support for ODF 1.3 export and multiple Open XML filter improvements.; Interface improvements include default locked toolbars for new profiles, new icon theme for macOS, updated Windows installer icons and banners, and improves renaming tooltip dialogs in Draw and Impress. |
| 7.1 | 3 February 2021 | This version introduced experimental support for Windows PCs based on ARM processors. New features included: Writer adds a Style Inspector for paragraph, character, and direct formatting attributes; configurable default image anchoring; improved Unicode detection; and faster find/replace.; Calc introduces an Enter key paste management option, enhanced Autofilter row selection, and faster Autofilter and find/replace performance.; Impress & Draw gain ability to add visible signatures to PDFs, batch animation editing, new presenter screen buttons, realistic soft shadows, and physics-based animation effects.; General improvements include a new user interface selector at startup, better printer paper size matching, full file visibility in Extension Manager, asynchronous print preview updates, and a one-click extension manager dialog.; Macro support expanded with the ScriptForge libraries for advanced scripting via Basic or Python. |
| 7.2 | 19 August 2021 | This version introduced experimental support for Mac computers using ARM/Apple Silicon-based processors. New features included: Writer now supports full-page background fills, gutter margins in page styles, and RDF metadata in the Style Inspector; Calc adds color filtering in AutoFilter and a new “fat cross” cursor option; Impress & Draw introduce new templates and support for multi-column text boxes; Math now allows scaling the formula input box; Interface improvements include command search, a scrollable style picker in the NotebookBar, a list view in the templates dialog, and a built-in UNO object inspector |
| 7.3 | 3 February 2022 | New features included: Writer now tracks table and row insertions/deletions in change tracking; Calc adds bash-style autocompletion for AutoInput and preserves whitespace/tab characters in formulas; Improved CSV and text import tools, including a new “Evaluate formulas” option and better filtering (e.g. color filters, “contains” support for numeric data); Quick Find in Calc can now search values instead of formulas; New PowerPoint-compatible screen sizes in Impress; Core updates include 1D barcode generation, unified line width options, and a new libcurl-based WebDAV backend |
| 7.4 | 18 August 2022 | New features included: Improved change tracking in Writer, including support for read-only documents, footnotes, and list numbering; Native support for Word content controls like rich text, checkboxes, dropdowns, and dates; New typographic hyphenation settings and grammar checking via remote LanguageTool APIs; Calc now supports sparklines, up to 16,384 columns, and formula bar height persistence; New functions in the AutoSum widget and sheet name search; Document themes and slide background fills supported in Impress & Draw for better PPTX compatibility; WebP, EMZ/WMZ image support and improved import/export for DOCX, PPTX, and PDF; Dark mode for Windows 10/11 and dark variant of Colibre icon theme; Extension Manager now includes a search field, and the Navigator scrolls to selected items |
| 7.5 | 2 February 2023 | New features included: Decorative object tagging, accessibility checker, and improved PDF forms in Writer; Machine translation support using DeepL APIs; Data tables in charts and description-based function search in Calc; Case-insensitive conditional formatting and persistent Paste Special settings; "Spell out" number formats added in Calc; Customizable table styles and object drag-and-drop in Impress & Draw; Croppable videos in slides; presenter console can run in windowed mode; Touchpad rotate and zoom gestures; Document filtering in Start Center and new application/MIME icons; PDF export improvements, font embedding on macOS, and variable font support for print and PDF |
| 7.6 | 21 August 2023 | This is the last version to support the FTP protocol. New features included: Writer features a new Page Number Wizard, direct editing of bibliography entries, style usage highlighting in text, improved Tables of Figures, and phrase-level spell checking via multi-word dictionary entries.; Calc adds a compact pivot table layout, better export handling for number formats and styles, support for sorting/filtering by cell color, improved comment styling, and enhanced text import options.; Impress and Draw introduce a slide navigation panel during presentations, improved object stacking in the Navigator, and enhanced PDF import/export with support for annotations and refined text scaling behavior.; Base adds new date and time functions for Firebird and MariaDB/MySQL in the query designer.; General improvements include support for multicolor gradients, document themes, touchpad zoom gestures, and categorized link targets in presentations. Entering grouped objects now dims external items for clarity.; The Start Center allows users to pin documents, and support was added for OOXML ZIP64 files and prefixed SVG elements. |
| 24.2 | 31 January 2024 | New features included: Writer gained support for Microsoft Word–compatible line breaking, collapsible nested sections, improved comment threading, and floating multi-page tables. Linkable elements can now be dragged from the Navigator, and legal-style numbered lists were added.; Calc introduced a search field in the Functions sidebar, scientific number format support in ODF, and improved sheet navigation and cell highlighting.; Impress added support for small caps formatting via the Character dialog.; Draw now supports importing multi-page TIFF files, placing one image per page.; Math introduced Arabic mathematical notation, custom font support, and enabled inline (visual) formula editing by default.; Core improvements include enhanced dark mode support across platforms, improved Expert Configuration with filtering and tooltips, and Unicode entry via Alt+NumPad codes on Windows.; Added support for SVG extensions in OOXML, the Drawing Canvas object from DOCX files, and ODF Wholesome Encryption.; The Insert Special Characters dialog now shows character descriptions, and password entry dialogs display strength indicators.; Armenian locale added. |
| 24.8 | 22 August 2024 | This version introduced support for Windows PCs based on ARM processors. New features included: Enhanced Writer tools such as improved comment panel resizing, expanded hyperlink and Find interfaces, and updated Navigator capabilities; New spreadsheet functions, better pivot table handling, and improved sheet protection in Calc; Impress enhancements including live slideshow updates, better note viewing, and faster PPTX import; Tiling pattern support in Draw and object-highlighting when hovering over layer tabs; Improved database connectivity in Base, with better Firebird stability and MS Access support via OLEDB; New chart types like "Pie-of-Pie" and "Bar-of-Pie" and improved chart text formatting; General improvements to accessibility, diacritic and Unicode support, and document export options; Introduction of a new password-based encryption method for ODF files; Better preservation of font and highlight colors across sessions |
| 25.2 | 6 February 2025 | This was the final version to support Windows 7 and 8.1. New features included: Improved comment navigation and tracked changes interface in Writer; Enhanced Solver functionality and duplicate record handling in Calc; Soft edge and glow effects in Impress, with improved SVG text rendering; Support for ODF 1.4 export and Visio templates (.vstx) import; Automatic document signing using a default certificate; macOS Quick Look integration; User interface improvements, including touch zoom on Windows and enhanced Sidebar controls |
| 25.8 | 20 August 2025 | New features included: Enhanced touchpad and accessibility features, including zoom gestures and better screen reader support; UI and icon themes automatically adjust to dark mode; Streamlined style and formatting tools: used styles and direct formatting are highlighted; nested sections and bibliography entries are easier to manage in Writer; Improved spreadsheet tools: new pivot table layout, support for sorting/filtering by color, and drawing styles for comments and shapes in Calc; Better presentation and drawing tools: refined text auto-scaling in Impress, object layering in Navigator, and support for PDF annotations; Expanded file format support: ZIP64 based DOCX files, enhanced SVG, and PDF 2.0 import/export features; Other quality-of-life improvements: Page Number Wizard, frequently used documents can be pinned in Start Center, special character descriptions, and multi-word spellchecking |
| 26.2 | 4 February 2026 | New features included: Floating tables in Writer can now be split into floating tables; Writer can automatically set the direction of RTL text while typing; Writer displays a more visible grid; Calc supports xmlMaps.xml; Support for Biff12 clipboard format for Microsoft Excel 2007 and newer was added; Support Microsoft Media Foundation APIs on Windows for video and audio playback of common codecs; Base is truly multi-user; Added connector support for Writer and Calc; Markdown import and export features; All dialogs use vertical tabs have icon for corresponding tab; Use native GTK and Qt color picker dialogs by default on Linux |

== Users and deployments ==
LibreOffice weekly downloads since 2010

From 2011 to 2018, the estimated number of LibreOffice users grew from 25 million to 200 million. In 2011, The Document Foundation estimated that 10 million users had obtained the software via downloads or CD-ROMs, mostly on Windows, with an additional 15 million users on Linux based on new or updated installations. By 2013, the user base was estimated at 75 million, increasing to 100 million in 2015, and 120 million in 2016. In 2018, The Document Foundation reported 200 million active users, with approximately 25% being students and 10% using Linux systems. For comparison, Microsoft Office had an estimated 1.2 billion users in 2018. By the 2020s, multiple European jurisdictions have adopted LibreOffice. In 2026, the number of downloads per week was about 1 million.

In October 2026, The Document Foundation made a clear statement that LibreOffice does not and will not have built in AI features and their core developers do not use LLMs to code the product.

== See also ==
- Comparison of office suites
- List of free and open-source software packages
- List of office suites
