= The Document Foundation =

Non-profit organization

- Abbreviation: TDF
- Predecessor: OpenOffice.org
- Formation: February 17, 2012; 14 years ago
- Founders: OpenOffice.org community members
- Type: Foundation
- Purpose: Office software
- Headquarters: Berlin, Germany
- Products: LibreOffice
- Members: 139 trustees (2025)
- Board Chair: Eliane Domingos
- Executive Director: Florian Effenberger
- Staff: 15 (2025)
- Website: documentfoundation.org

The Document Foundation is a non-profit organization that supports the development of LibreOffice, a free and open-source office suite. Established in 2010 by members of the OpenOffice.org community, TDF aims to provide a vendor-neutral platform for office software development, with a focus on the OpenDocument format. It is incorporated as a Stiftung (foundation) under German law.

TDF was created amid concerns that Oracle Corporation—which had acquired Sun Microsystems, the original sponsor of OpenOffice.org—might discontinue or limit its development, similar to the fate of OpenSolaris.

== Organization ==
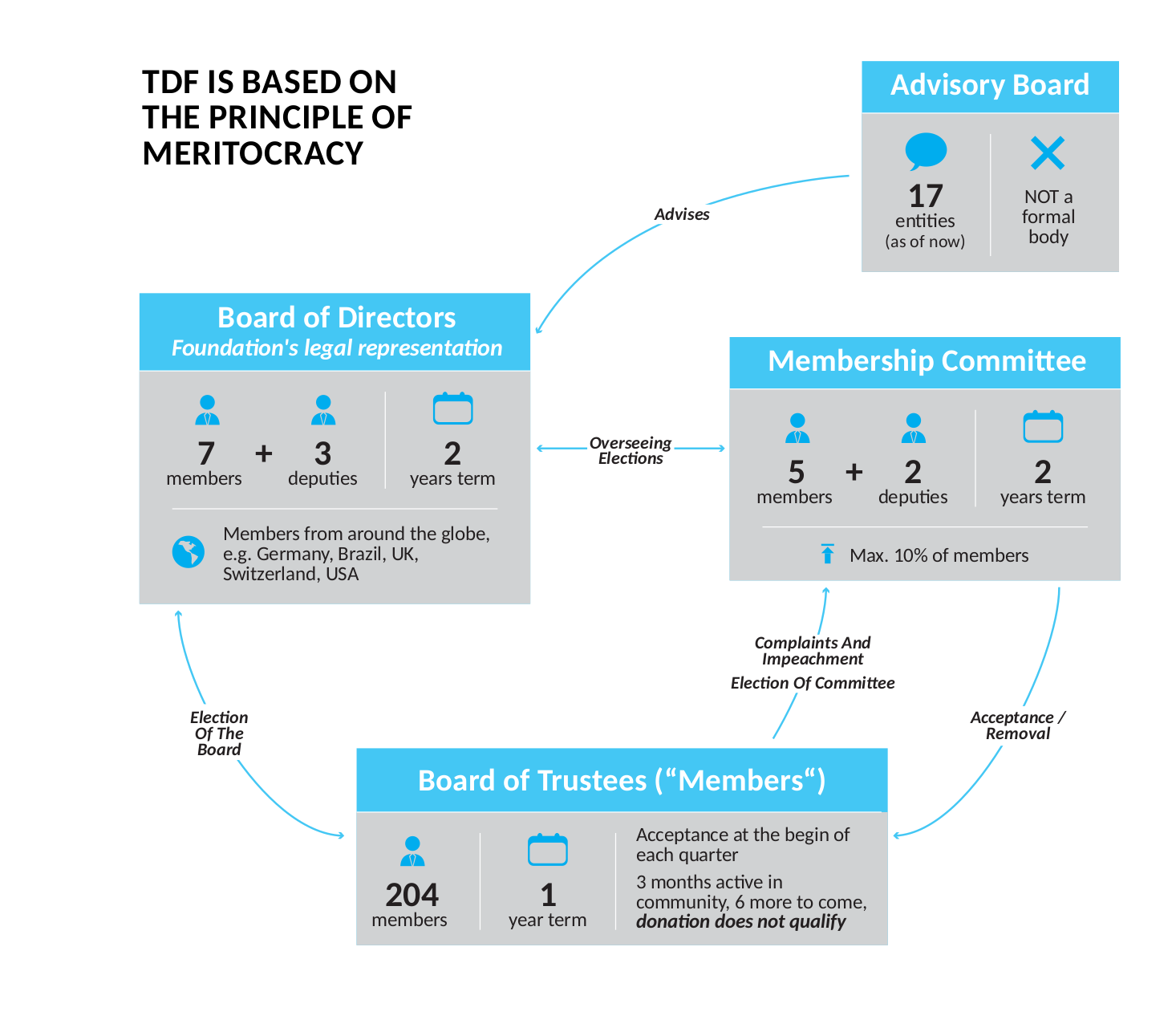
This image shows the relationship between various official groups within The Document Foundation, including the board of directors, the membership committee, and the board of trustees.

The Document Foundation has several governing bodies that oversee its operations:

- the Board of Directors, which represents the foundation and manages its day-to-day business
- the Membership Committee, which organizes elections and approves new trustees
- the Board of Trustees, who elect both the Board of Directors and the Membership Committee

This structure reflects the foundation's commitment to meritocracy. Membership in the Board of Trustees is only open to those who have been determined to have made meaningful contributions over a period of at least three months, and who commit to continued active participation for at least six more months. Admission is by application and approval by the Membership Committee. As of April 2025, there are 139 members on the Board of Trustees.

=== Board of directors and team ===
The Board of Directors has seven members and is elected every two years.

To manage day-to-day operations, The Document Foundation employs Florian Effenberger as executive director, who oversees a team of 14 staff members.

=== Advisory board ===
TDF established its Advisory Board in June 2011 to meet with organizations offering substantial financial or other support

The initial members included: Freies Office Deutschland e.V., Free Software Foundation, Google, Red Hat, Software in the Public Interest, and SUSE (then part of The Attachmate Group).

== History ==
=== Creation ===
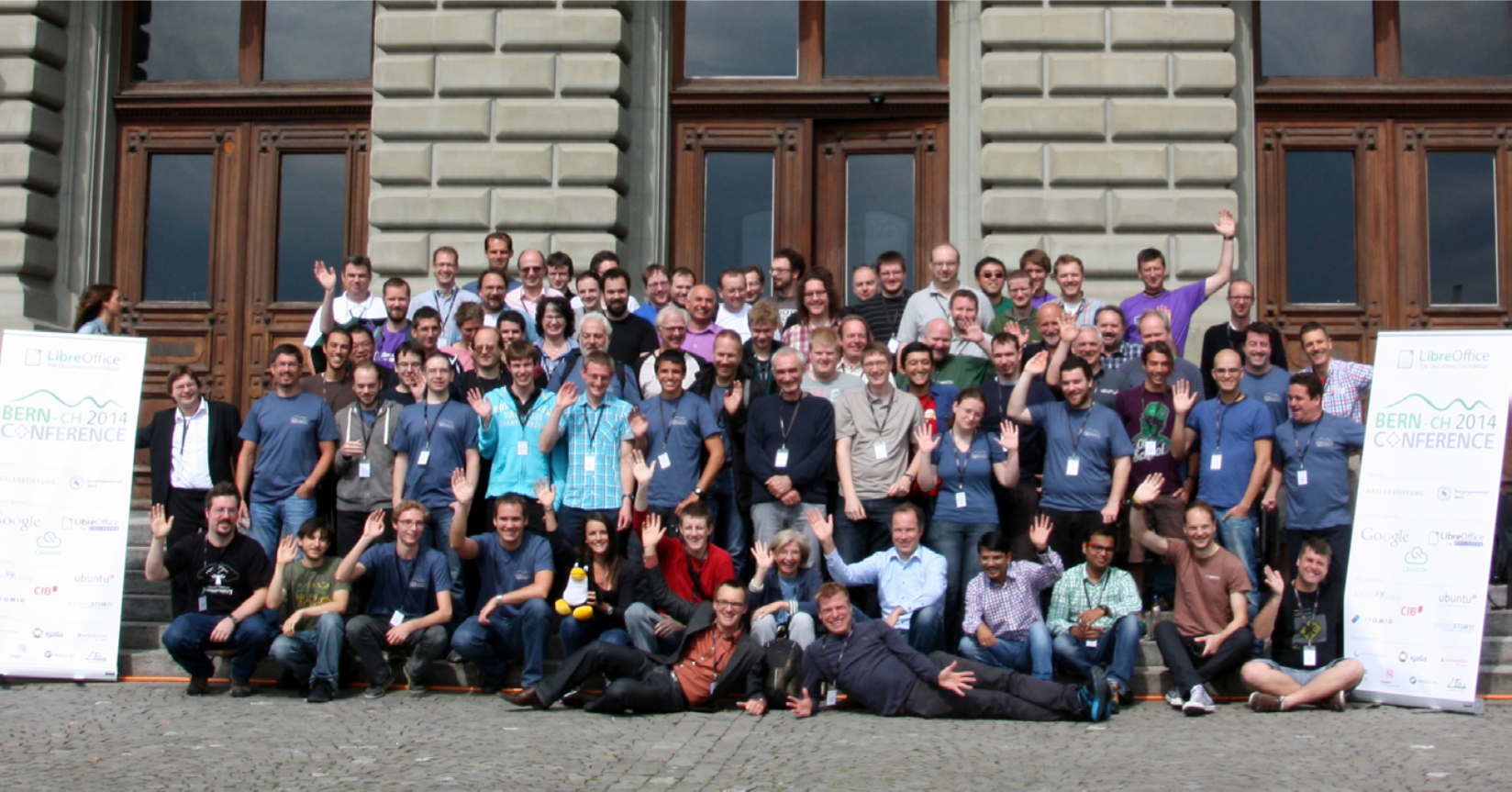
Audience of the LibreOffice Conference 2014 in Bern, including member of the board, the membership committee, the board of trustees and employees of the Document Foundation

The Document Foundation was announced on 28 September 2010 with the Foundation being governed by a "Steering Committee" during the phase of initial creation. The announcement received support from companies including Novell, Red Hat, Canonical and Google. In December 2010, The Document Foundation announced that the BrOffice Centre of Excellence for Free Software, the organization behind BrOffice joined the Foundation.

The Foundation also made available a re-branded fork of OpenOffice.org which was based on the upcoming 3.3 version, with patches and build software from the Go-oo fork. It was hoped that the LibreOffice name would be provisional as Oracle was invited to become a member of The Document Foundation, and was asked to donate the OpenOffice.org brand to the project. Following the announcement, Oracle asked members of the OpenOffice.org Community Council who were members of The Document Foundation to step down from the council, claiming that this represented a conflict of interest, leaving the community council composed 100% of Oracle employees.

Jacqueline Rahemipour, Co-Lead of the OpenOffice.org Board, stated:

Although it has been stressed several times that there will be collaboration on a technical level, and changes are possible – there is no indication from Oracle to change its mind on the question of the project organization and management. For those who want to achieve such a change, but see no realistic opportunity within the current project and are therefore involved in the TDF, unfortunately this results in an "either / or" question. The answer for us who sign this letter is clear: We want a change to give the community as well as the software it develops the opportunity to evolve. For this reason, from now on we will support The Document Foundation and will – as a team – develop and promote LibreOffice.

When the project was announced, The Document Foundation did not exist as a legal entity. The Steering Committee wished to formally set up a foundation, and following research chose to establish the foundation in Germany. On 16 February 2011, a fundraising drive was announced to raise the €50,000 needed to create a German foundation. The required amount was raised in eight days.

After clearing legal requirements, the foundation was finally incorporated on 17 February 2012.

In 2026, TDF decided to renew works on LibreOffice online. The action created a rift between Collabora and TDF. Eventually the friction escalated to the point that TDF decided to revoke all Collabora representatives in TDF.

==== Reaction ====
In assessing Oracle's role in the events surrounding the establishment of The Document Foundation, writer Ryan Cartwright in late October 2010 said:

The worst thing about this move by Oracle is that it will divide a community that didn't need to be divided. The free software community thrives on forked projects and will actively take the path of greater freedom. Mambo became Joomla, Xfree86 has all but disappeared and StarOffice is now regarded as the less-free cousin of OpenOffice.org (and not in a good way). What Oracle have just done is put their fingers in their ears and say "la la la" to their critics from within the free software community. With that move they will recruit several more opponents... The bottom line is that in all of this Oracle had golden opportunity after golden opportunity to make real progress for everyone – not just the OpenOffice.org or the free software community. They could have been the key player and the biggest part of the most popular free software office suite and they treated it like a runny nose. They blew it.

In October 2010 Linux Magazine's Bruce Byfield suggested that the formation of The Document Foundation is just the Go-oo project reinventing itself to the long-term detriment of users.

What happened, I suspect, was that Go-OO, already chafing under Sun's tight control of OpenOffice.org's direction, saw more of the same – if not worse – awaiting in Oracle. Hoping to succeed before Oracle could articulate its plans, Go-OO members reinvented themselves, and announced the foundation that they had long been calling for. But Oracle refused to be stampeded, and escalated the fork into something that resembles corporate warfare. Whatever the merits of either side (and I am most inclined to support The Document Foundation, although only on the principle that any number is greater than zero), I suspect that the losers in this situation will be the users. The risk is that time will continue to be spent in flame wars that could be better spent in coding. What seems likely is not only a general division and duplication of effort, but, in Oracle's case, a decision to focus on proprietary development as a defensive measure. By making the gambit that it did, The Document Foundation may have perpetuated another version of the stalemate that it was trying to break.

In April 2011, Oracle announced its intention to move OpenOffice.org to a "purely community-based project". Oracle also terminated its commercial product, called Oracle Open Office. In the view of some these moves were a reaction to the formation of The Document Foundation, but according to former Sun executive Simon Phipps:

The act of creating The Document Foundation and its LibreOffice project did no demonstrable harm to Oracle's business. There is no new commercial competition to Oracle Open Office (their commercial edition of OO.o) arising from LibreOffice. No contributions that Oracle valued were ended by its creation. Oracle's ability to continue development of the code was in no way impaired. Oracle's decision appears to be simply that, after a year of evaluation, the profit to be made from developing Oracle Open Office and Oracle Cloud Office did not justify the salaries of over 100 senior developers working on them both. Suggesting that TDF was in some way to blame for a hard-headed business decision that seemed inevitable from the day Oracle's acquisition of Sun was announced is at best disingenuous.

As of 2 June 2011 Oracle has relicensed OpenOffice.org under the Apache License 2.0 and transferred ownership of the project's assets and trademarks to the Apache Software Foundation.

=== The Document Liberation Project ===
On 2 April 2014, The Document Foundation announced the Document Liberation Project as its second top-level project. The project developed from LibreOffice community work on interoperability with proprietary document formats. Its first library, libvisio, was started as a Google Summer of Code 2011 project to parse binary Microsoft Visio files. After related parser and converter libraries using shared APIs grew to more than ten, the work was organised as an independent project within The Document Foundation in April 2014.

The project aims to help individuals, organisations and governments recover documents stored in obsolete or undocumented proprietary file formats, and to provide conversion mechanisms to open and standardised formats such as ODF. Its libraries include import support for formats used by WordPerfect, Microsoft Works, legacy Macintosh applications, AbiWord, CorelDRAW, Microsoft Publisher, Microsoft Visio, iWork, Adobe FreeHand, Adobe PageMaker, StarOffice, QuarkXPress and several e-book formats. The project also maintains export and infrastructure libraries such as librevenge, libodfgen and libepubgen, together with tools for producing plain text, HTML, CSV, SVG and ODF output.

Applications listed by the project as users of its import libraries include AbiWord, Calligra, Inkscape, LibreOffice and Scribus. The project invites contributions in code development, reverse engineering and documentation of undocumented file formats, and the preparation of sample documents for regression testing. Participating libraries are released, among other terms, under the Mozilla Public License 2.0, a choice the project says is intended to ensure that new knowledge about file formats benefits all users.

== Conferences ==
Starting in 2011, The Document Foundation has organized the annual LibreOffice Conference, as follows:

- 2011 – Paris, France – 12–15 October
- 2012 – Berlin, Germany – 17–19 October
- 2013 – Milan, Italy – 24–27 September
- 2014 – Bern, Switzerland – 3–5 September
- 2015 – Aarhus, Denmark – 23–25 September
- 2016 – Brno, Czech Republic – 7–9 September
- 2017 – Rome, Italy – 11–13 October
- 2018 – Tirana, Albania – 26–28 September
- 2019 – Almería, Spain – 11–13 September
- 2020 – web conferencing – 15–17 October
- 2021 – web conferencing – 23–25 September
- 2022 – Milan, Italy & remotely (hybrid) – 28 September–1 October
- 2023 – Bucharest, Romania – 20–23 September
- 2024 – Luxembourg, Luxembourg – 10–12 October
- 2025 – Budapest, Hungary – 4–6 September
- 2026 – Pordenone, Italy – 10–12 September (announced)
