= StarOffice =

Discontinued office suite software

- Running on Windows 7 420,
- Developers: Star Division (1985‍–‍1999); Sun Microsystems (1999‍–‍2009); Oracle Corporation (2010‍–‍2011)
- Release: 1985; 41 years ago
- Final release: Oracle Open Office 3.3 / December 15, 2010; 15 years ago
- Operating system: CP/M, Linux, MS-DOS, Mac OS X, Solaris, Windows
- Platform: x86, SPARC
- Successor: OpenOffice.org
- Standard: OpenDocument
- Type: Office suite
- License: Trialware
- Website: www.staroffice.com

StarOffice is a discontinued proprietary office productivity software suite. Its source code continues today in derived free and open-source office suites Collabora Online and LibreOffice. StarOffice supported the OpenOffice.org XML file format, as well as the OpenDocument standard, and could generate PDF and Flash formats. It included templates, a macro recorder, and a software development kit (SDK).

The software originated in 1985 as StarWriter by Star Division, which marketed the suite with some success, primarily in Europe. StarOffice was acquired by Sun Microsystems in 1999, which released the source code the following year as a free and open source office suite called OpenOffice.org, which subsequent versions of StarOffice were based on, with additional proprietary components. Sun Microsystems was acquired by Oracle Corporation in 2010, and the product was known briefly as Oracle Open Office before being discontinued in 2011, with Oracle turning OpenOffice.org into a "purely community-based project".

== History ==
StarWriter 1.0 was written by Marco Börries in 1985 for the Zilog Z80. Börries formed Star Division in Lüneburg the following year. It was later ported to the Amstrad CPC (marketed by Schneider in Germany) under CP/M and later ported to the 8086-based Amstrad PC-1512, running under MS-DOS 3.2. Later, the integration of the other individual programs followed as the development progressed to an office suite for MS-DOS, OS/2 Warp, and Windows. Star Division marketed its suite under the name "StarOffice".

Until version 4.2, Star Division based StarOffice on the cross-platform C++ class library StarView. In 1998 Star Division began offering StarOffice for free.

Sun Microsystems acquired the company, copyright and trademark of StarOffice in 1999 for US$73.5 million, as it was cheaper than 42000 licenses of Microsoft Office.

In March 2009, a study showed that StarOffice had a 3% market share in the corporate market.

== Naming ==
StarSuite was the version of StarOffice with Asian language localization. It included Japanese, Korean, Simplified Chinese and Traditional Chinese interfaces. It also included additional fonts for the East Asian market, resulting in slightly larger installation footprint. Otherwise the features were identical to StarOffice.

The two brands existed because a StarOffice brand was owned by another company in certain Asian countries. Currently NEC produces StarOffice collaborative software (unrelated to the one discussed here) in Japan. After Oracle acquired Sun Microsystems (in January 2010) it renamed both StarOffice and StarSuite as "Oracle Open Office".

== Sun ONE Webtop ==
In 2001, Sun Microsystems announced Sun ONE Webtop – formerly known as project StarPortal – a limited release. It was based on StarOffice components.

== Components ==
- Writer – word processor .sdw (StarWriter 5.x) .sxw (StarOffice 6.x) .odt .ott -files
- Calc – spreadsheet .sdc (StarCalc 5.x) .sxc (6.x) .ods .ots -files
- Impress – presentation program .sdd (StarImpress 5.x) .sxi (6.x) .odp .otp -files
- Draw – drawing program .sda (StarDraw 5.x) .sxd (6.x) .odg .otg -files
- Base – database .sdb (StarBase 5.x) .odb -files
- Math – formula editor .smf (StarMath 5.x) .sxm (6.x) .odf -files

=== Older discontinued components ===
- StarSchedule – personal information manager .sds -files
- StarMail – e-mail client
- StarDiscussion – news client
- StarImage – image editor
- Web browser
- HTML editor

=== Proprietary components ===
- Several font metric compatible Unicode TrueType fonts containing bitmap representations for better appearance at smaller font sizes
- Twelve Western fonts (including Andalé Sans, Arial Narrow, Arial Black, Broadway, Garamond, Imprint MT Shadow, Kidprint, Palace Script, Sheffield) and seven Asian language fonts (including support for the Hong Kong Supplementary Character Set)
- Adabas D database
- StarOffice-only templates and sample documents
- A large clip-art gallery
- Sorting functionality for Asian versions
- File-import filters for additional older word-processing formats (including EBCDIC, DisplayWrite, MultiMate, PFS Write, WordStar, WordStar 2000, and XyWrite (conversion filters licensed from MasterSoft))
- A different spell checker than that used by OpenOffice.org, and thesaurus
- StarOffice Configuration Manager
- Macro Converter for converting Microsoft Office VBA macros to StarOffice Basic

For StarOffice Enterprise Edition only:

- Professional Analysis Wizard
- Wizard to create Microsoft Windows Installer Transformation files (.mst files)

=== Other differences ===
There are also differences in the documentation, training and support options, and some minor differences in the look and icons between StarOffice and OpenOffice.org.

Other differences are that StarOffice only supports 12 languages, compared to over 110 for OpenOffice.org.

== Version history ==
StarOffice release history
Version	Release date	OOo version	Description
I	1985		Star-Writer for CP/M
I 3.0	1986		Star-Writer for CP/M
I 3.1	1986		Star-Writer for CP/M
1.0	1986		StarWriter for MS-DOS 3.2.
1.0	1988		StarWriter for Atari ST
2.0	1994		StarWriter, StarCalc and StarBase for Windows 3.1.
3.0	1995		StarWriter, StarCalc, StarDraw, StarImage, StarChart. MS-DOS, Windows 3.1, OS/2, Solaris SPARC, Power Macintosh.
3.1	1996-07		First to support Linux.
4.0	1997		
5.0	1998-11		
5.1	1999-05-20		
5.2	2000-06-20		First Sun release.
6.0	2002-05	1.0	
7.0	2003-11-14	1.1-2.4	
8.0	2005-09-27	2.0-2.4	
9.0	2008-11-17	3.0-3.2	
Oracle Open Office 3.3	2010-12-15	3.3 beta	Last release.

=== StarOffice 2.0 ===
StarWriter was the first StarOffice, with the successor being StarOffice 2.0 which included StarWriter compact, StarBase 1.0, StarDraw 1.0.

Supported platforms included MS-DOS.

=== StarOffice 3 ===
StarOffice 3.0 included StarWriter 3.0, StarCalc 3.0, StarDraw 3.0, StarImage, StarChart.

Supported platforms included MS-DOS, Windows 3.1, OS/2, Solaris on SPARC. Power Mac beta support was introduced in 1996.

==== 3.1 ====
Supported platforms included Windows 3.1/95, OS/2 (16-bit), Linux i386, Solaris Sparc/x86, Mac OS 7.5 – 8.0.

Caldera, Inc. supported the Linux-port of StarOffice 3.1 with approximately 800,000 DM in order to offer the product with their forthcoming OpenLinux distribution in 1997.

=== StarOffice 4.0 ===
Supported platforms included Windows 3.1/95, OS/2, Linux i386, Solaris Sparc/x86, classic Mac OS (beta).

=== StarOffice 5 ===
5.0 was released late November 1998. Supported platforms included Windows 95/NT 3.51, OS/2, Linux i386, Solaris Sparc/x86.

==== 5.1 ====
5.1 was released 20 May 1999. Supported platforms included Windows 95, OS/2, Linux i386, Solaris Sparc/x86.

==== 5.2 ====
5.2 was released 20 June 2000. Sun offered StarOffice 5.2 as a free download for personal use, and soon went through an exercise similar to Netscape's relicensing of Mozilla, by releasing most of the StarOffice source code under a free/open source license. The resultant free/open source software codebase fork continued development as OpenOffice.org, with contributions from both Sun and the wider OpenOffice.org community. Sun then took "snapshots" of the OpenOffice.org code base, integrated proprietary and third-party code modules, and marketed the package commercially.

StarOffice 5.2 was the last version to contain the programs listed under older discontinued components. It was also the last version to support multiple virtual desktops, previously available from within the Suite.

Supported platforms included: MS Windows 95/98/NT/2000, Linux i386, Solaris Sparc/x86.

=== StarOffice 6 ===
A beta version of 6.0 (based on OpenOffice.org 638c) was released in October 2001; the final 6.0 (based on OpenOffice.org 1.0) was released in May 2002.

Support for OpenOffice.org XML file format.

Supported platforms included Windows 95, Linux i386, Solaris Sparc/x86. OpenOffice.org version also supported Windows ME/2000 for Asian/CJK versions, generic Linux 2.2.13 with glibc2 2.1.3, Solaris 7 SPARC (8 for Asian version).

=== StarOffice 7 ===
Based on OpenOffice.org 1.1. Released 14 November 2003.

Supported platforms included Windows 98, Linux i386, Solaris 8 Sparc/x86. OpenOffice.org version also supports generic Linux with Glibc 2.2.0, Mac OS X 10.2 for PowerPC with X11 in OOO 1.1.2.

Product Update 5 added Windows NT 4.0 as a supported platform and incorporated support for the OpenDocument file-format.

Product Updates 6-8 are based on OpenOffice.org 2.1. The OOO version added support for Mac OS X 10.3 for PowerPC, and for Mac OS X 10.4 for x86.

Product Updates 9-11 built on OpenOffice.org 2.2. New features included enhanced Windows Vista integration, PDF export.

Product Update 12 was based on OpenOffice.org 2.4. The OOO version added support for Linux x86-64, Linux MIPS, Linux S390, Mac OS X x86/PowerPC above 10.4. New features included improved input and sorting in Calc, block markings in text documents, new import filtering, improved security, access to WebDAV servers via HTTPS, and PDF export for long-term archiving.

=== StarOffice 8 ===
Sun released StarOffice 8 (based on the code of OpenOffice.org 2.0) on 27 September 2005, adding support for the OpenDocument standard and a number of improvements.

Supported platforms include Windows 98/2000 (Service Pack 2 or higher), Linux i386, Solaris 8 Sparc/x86.

Product Updates 2–5 are based on OpenOffice.org 2.1.

Product Updates 6–7 are based on OpenOffice.org 2.2. New features include enhanced Windows Vista integration, PDF export.

Product Updates 8–9 are based on OpenOffice.org 2.3. New features include bookmark support for PDF export, MediaWiki export in Writer.

Product Updates 10–11 are based on OpenOffice.org 2.4. New features include improved input and sorting in Calc, block markings in text documents, new import filter, improved security, access to WebDAV servers via HTTPS, PDF export for long-term archiving.

=== StarOffice 9 ===
Icon of StarOffice 9

StarOffice 9, released 17 November 2008, added support for version 1.2 of the OpenDocument standard and Microsoft Office 2007 files and a number of other improvements.

It is based on OpenOffice.org 3.0.

Supported platforms include Windows 2000 (Service Pack 2 or higher), Mac OS X 10.4 (Intel version), Linux 2.4 i386 with glibc2 version 2.3.2 or higher, GTK version 2.2.0 or higher, Solaris 10 for Sparc/x86. OOO version supports Mac OS X PowerPC, generic Linux platforms.

Product Update 1 is based on OpenOffice.org 3.0.1, which adds improved extension manager, but requires extensions in the new format

Product Update 2 is based on OpenOffice.org 3.1.0.

Product Update 3 is based on OpenOffice.org 3.1.1.

Product Update 4 is based on OpenOffice.org 3.2.

=== Oracle Open Office ===
Screenshot of Oracle Open Office 3.3.1, the last version before the suite's discontinuation

Oracle bought Sun in January 2010 and quickly renamed StarOffice as Oracle Open Office.

On 15 December 2010, Oracle released Oracle Open Office 3.3, based on OpenOffice.org 3.3 beta, and a web-based version called Oracle Cloud Office. The suite was released in two versions, sold at €39 and €49.95.

== Pricing and licensing ==
Traditionally, StarOffice licenses sold for around US$70, but in 2004, Sun planned to offer subscription-based licenses to Japanese customers for about ¥1,980 (US$17) per year (Becker, 2004). P. Ulander, a desktop products manager for Sun, acknowledged that Sun planned to expand subscription-based licenses to other countries as well. In January 2009, Sun's website offered StarOffice for US$34.95.

Sun used a per-person license for StarOffice, compared to the per-device licenses used for most other proprietary software. An individual purchaser gains the right to install the software on up to five computers. For example, a small-business owner can have the software on laptop, office and home computers, or a user with a computer running Microsoft Windows, and another running Linux, can install StarOffice on both computers.

In 2010, StarOffice 9 Software was no longer offered free of charge to education customers, but StarOffice 8 could still be used without charge. The free OpenOffice.org 3.0, with the same functionality as StarOffice 9, could also be used. Sun also offered free web-based training and an online tutorial for students and teachers, free support services for teachers (including educational templates for StarOffice) and significantly discounted technical support for schools.

From August 2007 to November 2008, Google offered StarOffice 8 as part of its free downloadable Google Pack application.

== Derivatives ==
OpenOffice.org was open source, and gave rise to many derivative versions and successor projects to StarOffice. As of 2024, Collabora Online and LibreOffice are still actively developed. Apache OpenOffice is mostly dormant and has not seen a new major release for over 10 years. NeoOffice was also a derivative, but it was discontinued in the end of 2023.

A timeline of major derivatives of StarOffice and OpenOffice.org
StarOffice
OpenOffice.org
Go-oo
IBM Workplace/IBM Lotus Symphony
NeoOffice
LibreOffice
Apache OpenOffice
Collabora Online/Collabora Office

== See also ==
- Comparison of office suites
- Applixware
