= .dbf =

DBASE database file format family

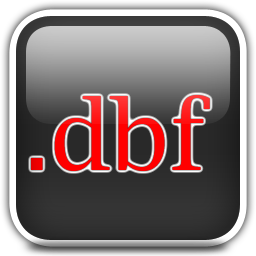
- Filename extension: .dbf
- Internet media type: application/dbf, application/dbase
- Developed by: dBase
- Initial release: 1983; 43 years ago
- Latest release: 7
- Website: dbase.com

The .dbf file extension represents the dBase database file. The file type was introduced in 1983 with dBASE II. The file structure has evolved to include many features and capabilities. Several additional file types have been added to support data storage and manipulation. The current .dbf file level is called Level 7. The .dbf format is supported by a number of database products.

== Overview ==
The original dBASE database was known as Project Vulcan and was started by Wayne Ratliff in 1978. At the time the file that held the data was a simple table that could have data added, modified, deleted or printed using the ASCII characters set. By 1985 PC Magazine described its file format, .dbf, as "a de facto standard" for other software. As the product became more popular .dbf was expanded, and additional files were added to increase the capabilities of the database system. Despite dBASE being an IDE (integrated development environment), a database system, a compiler, and a database application builder, the original .dbf file was still used for the actual data storage mechanism.

== History of the file format ==
=== Classical .dbf ===
Project Vulcan – CP/M (Level 1)
There is no publicly available information on the original layout. What is known is that it was a simple table which allowed adding, deleting, modifying, and outputting ASCII data. It was written for 8-bit machines that ran CP/M.
dBASE II – MS-DOS (Level 2)
dBASE II was the first major release by Ashton-Tate. It had many advancements beyond the simple table structures of Project Vulcan.
- Still written for 8-bit computing
- Increased the number of fields from 16 to 32
- Introduced a SORT routine
- 16-bit version finally released in April 1983 (version 2.4)
dBASE III – MSDOS (Level 2sh)
dBASE III (version "1.0"), was released in June 1984. This was a fully 16-bit application. dBASE III's file format is a transitional step between dBASE II and dBASE III+.

=== Modern dBASE ===
dBASE III+ – MS-DOS (Level 3)
dBASE III+ was released in December 1985. It ushered the modern dBASE file format. It is incompatible with dBASE III's file format.
dBASE IV – MS-DOS (Level 4)
- 1.0 x322 Oct 1988
- 1.0 x55 Mar 1993 – dBASE Compiler
- 2.0 x12 Oct 1993 Includes fixes in dBASE IV v2.0 x16 above (not x17 i.e. not VLM compatible, dB5D exe's are compatible). It's also a new version that contain new features not in the V1.0 product:
  - 32-bit generation
  - Auto compiling and linking
  - Smaller .EXE size
  - Menu-driven user interface
  - Linker can produce combined .DBO output
  - Linker can produce a .MAP file
  - Compiler supports alternate date formats
  - command-line switches accept wildcards in file names.
dBASE V – MS-DOS (Level 5)
1.0 x46 Jun 1994
BDE – Borland Database Engine 2.52

This was the last update to the 16-bit version of the Borland Database Engine (BDE).

dBASE V – MS-Windows (Level 5)

- 5.5 b673 Jul 1995

==== xBase ====
xBase is a name applied to clones of the dBase, typically dBASE III+–V. Most xBase programs either use the format directly or uses a derived format with custom extensions. Erik Bachmann maintains an open-licensed description of these formats.

=== dBASE 7 ===
The Level 7 structure is the latest supported by dBASE and BDE. It is incompatible with the previous file format, and is supported by few third-party applications.

dBASE 7 – MS-Windows (Level 7)

- 7.0 b1345 Dec 1997 Full 32 bit version for Win 95/NT

Level 7 brought many improvements. The maximum length for field names increased from 10 to 31 characters. Some new fields types were added, such as the auto-increment field, which prevents creation of duplicate record numbers in the same table.

BDE version 5.1.0

Significant improvements over the prior releases. There are also some limitations with regards to what the BDE can handle.

== File format of Level 5 DOS dBASE ==
The "modern dBASE" III+–V is the most common dBASE file format found in the wild. In "modern dBASE", a .dbf file consists of a header, the data records, and the end-of-file marker.

- The header contains information about the file, such as the number of records and the number of types of fields used in the records.
- The records contain the actual data.
- The end of the file is marked by a single byte, with value 0x1A.

=== File header ===
Layout of file header in dBase level 5
Byte	Contents	Meaning
0	1 byte	Valid dBASE for DOS file; bits 0–2 indicate version number, bit 3 indicates the presence of a dBASE for DOS memo file, bits 4–6 indicate the presence of a SQL table, bit 7 indicates the presence of any memo file (either dBASE m PLUS or dBASE for DOS)
1–3	3 bytes	Date of last update; formatted as YYMMDD (with YY being the number of years since 1900)
4–7	4 bytes (LE)	Number of records in the database file
8–9	2 bytes (LE)	Number of bytes in the header
10–11	2 bytes (LE)	Number of bytes in the record
12–13	2 bytes	Reserved; fill with 0
14	1 byte	Flag indicating incomplete transaction (Note: The ISMARKEDO function checks this flag. BEGIN TRANSACTION sets it to 1, END TRANSACTION and ROLLBACK reset it to 0.)
15	1 byte	Encryption flag (Note: If this flag is set to 1, the message Database encrypted appears. Changing this flag to 0 removes the message, but does not decrypt the file.)
16–27	12 bytes	Reserved for dBASE for DOS in a multi-user environment
28	1 byte	Production .mdx file flag; 1 if there is a production .mdx file, 0 if not
29	1 byte	Language driver ID
30–31	2 bytes	Reserved; fill with 0
32–n (Note: The maximum number of fields is 255.) (Note: n means the last byte in the field descriptor array. The array's size depends on the number of fields used in a database. n is equal to 31 + 32 * (number of fields).)	32 bytes each	array of field descriptors (see below for layout of descriptors)
n + 1	1 byte	0x0D as the field descriptor array terminator

=== Field descriptor array ===
Layout of field descriptors in dBase level 5 (used inside the file header)
Byte	Contents	Meaning
0–10	11 bytes	Field name in ASCII (zero-filled)
11	1 byte	Field type. Allowed values: C, D, F, L, M, or N (see next table for meanings)
12–15	4 bytes	Reserved
16	1 byte	Field length in binary (maximum 254 (0xFE)).
17	1 byte	Field decimal count in binary
18–19	2 bytes	Reserved
20	1 byte	Work area ID
21–30	10 bytes	Reserved
31	1 byte	Production MDX field flag; 1 if field has an index tag in the production MDX file, 0 if not

=== Database records ===
Each record begins with a 1-byte "deletion" flag. The byte's value is a space (0x20), if the record is active, or an asterisk (0x2A), if the record is deleted. Fields are packed into records without field separators or record terminators.

All field data is ASCII. Depending on the field's type, the application imposes further restrictions:

Field types in dBase level 5
Field type	Mnemonic	What it accepts
C	Character	Any ASCII text (padded with spaces up to the field's length)
D	Date	Numbers and a character to separate month, day, and year (stored internally as 8 digits in YYYYMMDD format)
F	Floating point	-, ., 0–9 (right justified, padded with whitespaces)
L	Logical	Y, y, N, n, T, t, F, f, or ? (when uninitialized)
M	Memo	Any ASCII text (stored internally as 10 digits representing a .dbt block number, right justified, padded with whitespaces)
N	Numeric	-, ., 0–9 (right justified, padded with whitespaces)

=== Memo fields and the .DBT file ===
A memo (.DBT) file consists of blocks numbered sequentially (0,1,2, and so on). SET BLOCKSIZE determines the size of each block. The first block, block 0, is the memo file header.

Each memo field of each record in the .DBF file contains the number of the block (in ASCII) where the memo field begins. If the memo field contains no data, the .DBF file contains blanks (0x20) rather than a number.

When a memo field's content changes, its block number may also change. I.e. the memo gets relocated. In that case, the number in the .DBF file gets updated.

In dBASE III PLUS, the space consumed by deleted text in a memo field cannot be reused — the .DBT file size grows each time text is added, even if other text has been deleted. dBASE for DOS may reuse that space for new text. dBASE IQ PLUS always appended new text to the end of the .dbt file.

== Other file types found in dBASE ==
dBASE defines many types of files. It also recognizes some operating system files and files from other products. The table below lists the most commonly used formats first. It was compiled from the documentation of dBASE III+, dBASE IV, and dBASE CLASSIC.

File types recognized by dBASE, up to dBASE CLASSIC
Extension	File content
.DBF	Database file
.DBK	Database backup file
.DBO	Command and procedure object file
.DBT	Database memo file
.DEF	Selector definition file
.DEM	Define statements for a CUA form
.DIF	Data Interchange Format, or VisiCalc file; used with APPEND FROM and COPY TO
.DOC	Documentation file; Applications Generator only
.ERR	Created if an error occurs during form generation, or if an unrecoverable error occurs
.FIL	Files list design object file
.EMO	Compiled format (.fmt) file
.FMT	Generated format file; from .scr file
.FNL	Report binary name list file
.FR3	Renamed old dBASE HI report form (.frm) file
.ERG	Generated report form file; from .frm file
.FRM	Report form file
.FRO	Compiled report form (.ERG) file
.FW2, .FW3, .FW4	Framework spreadsheet or database file; used for import and export
.GEN	Template file
.GRP	Windows group file for dBASE for DOS
.HLP	dBASE for DOS help files
.ICO	dBASE for DOS icon file under Windows
.INI	Windows-like INI file to save Label Designer and IDE state information.
.KEY	Keystroke macro library file
.LB3	Renamed old dBASE III label form (.LBL) file
.LBG	Generated label form file; from .LBL file
.LBL	Label form file
.LBO	Compiled label form (.LBL) file
.LOG	Transaction log file
.LNL	Label binary name list file
.MBK	Multiple index backup file
.MDX	Multiple index file
.MEM	Memory file
.NDX	Single index file
.OVL	dBASE for DOS overlay file
PIF	Microsoft Windows file for non-Windows applications
.POP	Pop-up menu design object file; Applications Generator only
.PR2	Printer driver file
.PRD	A file containing printer driver information for DBSETUP
.PRF	Print form file
.PRG	dBASE command or procedure file
.PRS	dBASE SQL command or procedure file
.PRT	Printer output file
.QBE	QBE query file
.QBO	Compiled QBE query (.QBE) file
.QRY	dBASE El query file
.RES	Resource file
.RPD	RapidFile file; used for import and export
.SC3	Renamed old dBASE III screen (.SCR) file
.SCR	Screen file
.SNL	Screen binary name list file
.STR	Structure list design object file; Applications Generator only
.T44/.W44	Intermediate work files; used by SORT and INDEX
.TBK	Database memo backup file
.TXT	ASCII text output file
.UPD	QBE update query file
.UPO	Compiled QBE update query (.UPD) file
.VAL	Values list design object file; Applications Generator only
.VMC	Configuration file; for Virtual Memory Manager (VMM)
.VUE	View file
.WIN	Logical window save file
.WKS, .WK1	Lotus 1-2-3 file; used with APPEND FROM and COPY TO

== See also ==
- Clipper – Compiler for xBase
- File format – Structure of information stored on a computer
- FoxBASE – Programming language
- VP-Info – Database language and compiler
