= AdvPL =

Programming language

- Designed by: TOTVS

Influenced by
- xBase

AdvPL (Advanced Protheus Language) is a proprietary programming language based on xBase. It was released in 1999 and is used for development of applications in the ERP Protheus made by TOTVS.
