= KnowledgeMan =

- Developer: Micro Data Base Systems
- Initial release: 1983; 43 years ago
- Type: database management system

KnowledgeMan was an early computer database management system created by Micro Data Base Systems of Lafayette, Indiana. KnowledgeMan was introduced in 1983 and was a PC-sized version of the company's mainframe computing database software. KnowledgeMan was promoted to users of dBase as a faster database system that utilized more sophisticated computing power. It had a macro language and SQL "structured query language" that allowed reports, its own spreadsheet interface and statistical graphics, i.e., pie charts, bar charts, etc. KnowledgeMan was designed by David Bartkus.

KnowledgeMan was the first database management system to be ported from a mainframe system. It was also the first written for the 16-bit PC processor. KnowledgeMan was the first to separate the database engine from the command interface, something that Microsoft Access was lauded for a decade later.

Micro Data Base Systems developed a graphical user interface for KnowledgeMan (by then more frequently called KMan) in 1985, although this was not popular with developers, who preferred to use the software's command line interface. In 1986 they introduced Guru, an expert system that incorporated KnowledgeMan's database and a graphical user interface. In the mid-1990s, KnowledgeMan was folded into Guru.

In 2004, Micro Data Base Systems folded and its product line was taken over by Savitar Corporation. Savitar folded in 2008.

== Uses ==
Besides its uses in business computing, KnowledgeMan was used by archaeologists, including on a Neanderthal site in France, and on the remains of New Amsterdam in New York City and elsewhere, by physicists at FermiLab.
