= DbDOS =

Software

dbDOS
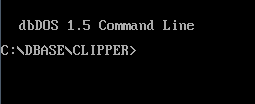
- Developer: dBase
- Stable release: 3.0 / September 25, 2012
- Operating system: Windows
- Platform: Intel architecture
- Type: emulator
- License: Commercial proprietary software
- Website: www.dbdos.com

dbDOS is software developed by dBase for Windows computers with Intel processors. dbDOS allows Intel-based PCs to run DOS Applications, such as dBASE III, dBASE IV (Version 1, 2, 3), and dBASE V for DOS in an emulated DOS environment. It is an environment configured specifically to allow the various versions of dBASE for DOS to run without any changes to the dBASE executables or the dBASE compiled programs created.

The company dBase offers licenses for dBase CLASSIC (DOS).

== Overview ==
In the late 1980s to early 1990s, dBase for DOS was one of the more popular database tools on the market. When Borland decided to stop the development of the DOS version in favour of the Windows version, many companies were left providing support for themselves.

Many decided to keep their applications running on the DOS platform for many years following Borland's switch to Windows. This strategy worked well enough until Microsoft decided to make some changes in the way the underlying operating system worked. And as more and more PC started supporting 64-bit operating systems, the ability to keep dBASE for DOS running on maintainable hardware became difficult.

In 2012, the newly formed dBase LLC opted to support this install base of dBASE applications by releasing a virtualization tool named dbDOS. Based on the popular DOSBox, dbDOS quickly became an easy way to enable virtually any DOS-based application on Microsoft's Windows XP, Vista, Windows 7, Windows Server 2003 and Windows Server 2008, both 32- and 64-bit versions of the operating systems. With enhanced support for dBASE III, dBASE IV (Version 1, 2, 3), and dBASE V for DOS, dbDOS is the easiest way to keep mission-critical applications up and running for years to come.

dbDOS 1.0 was released on May 23, 2012, following the restructuring of dBase LLC in April 2012.

== System requirements ==
The dbDOS virtual machine requires an Intel-based personal computer running Microsoft Windows. The computer must have at least 1 gigabyte of RAM and at least 100 megabytes of free hard drive space available.

Once the virtual machine software known as dbDOS is installed, the user is then free to install additional application software provide they have the originally licensed installation media available.

== Features ==
- Easy-to-use wizard-based interface supports importing and exporting multiple environment configurations
- No modifications to dBASE or any other applications are required
- Ability to run any DOS programs* (beta)
- Very small footprint, under 10 megabytes of storage needed for the running program
- Revive existing applications instead of rewriting them
- Original installation media and licence from the manufacturer are required to install and run applications within Dados

dBase dbDOS 1.1 was released as a free upgrade on June 22, 2012. New features in this release include:

- Ability to print ESC and printer-specific codes to the host OS's printers (either networked or connected)

dBase dbDOS 1.5 was released as a free upgrade on September 25, 2012. New features in this release include:

- Increased overall performance.
- Enhanced memory capabilities with JEMM386 enable programs to run much faster
- Clipboard feature for pasting text into DOS from Windows

dBase dbDOS PRO 2 was released in a new professional version on August 23, 2013. New features in this release include: August 23, 2013

- Enhanced printing capability to now closely resemble printouts from the 1980s and 1990s.
- New copy from Windows clipboard to dbDOS VM.
- New copy/paste from unique dbDOS buffer to Windows.
- Double the performance of the 1. x product.
- New Print Screen functionality introduced.
- Support for Windows 8

dBase dbDOS PRO 3 was released on May 2, 2014. New features in this release include: May 2, 2014

- PDF output to print to paper, to PDF, or to both at the same time
- New print features – new “Enhanced” printing feature that provides a more accurate version of those reports than ever before
- New print features – new “Direct” printing feature that handles more ESC codes and sequences for use when RAW, Interpreted, and Enhanced can not get it right (Expert Mode).
- New print features – a print driver that will allow better printing across new printers requiring one-line code change
- Easy DOS Configuration Wizard simplifies the setup and launching of a single dBASE program
- Enhanced DOS SHELL functionality
- Display for resolutions above 800x600 is 100% sharper and easier to read
- Improved backup system that makes it easier to find the configuration

dBase dbDOS PRO 4 was released on May 6, 2015. New features in this release include: May 6, 2014

- New live files system allows to make changes outside of the dbDOS VM and see changes immediately inside the VM.
- dbDOS PRO 4 engine is 38% faster than the last release
- 4DOS Integration – Will allow for more advanced command processing in the product and running DOS-based scripts.
- New look – The new look makes the product easier to understand and use right out of the box.
- Enhanced PDF print functionality.
- Enhanced Display for resolutions above 800x600 is 100% sharper and easier to read.

dBase dbDOS PRO 4N was released on May 18, 2015. New features in this release include: May 18, 2014

- Multi-User Support
- New live files system allows to make changes outside of the dbDOS VM and see changes immediately inside the VM
- dbDOS PRO 4 is 38% faster than the last release
- dbDOS PRO 4N is built on top of the widely used dbDOS PRO 4 product and it includes all the features of that product

== Architecture ==
dBase dbDOS has a unique architecture.

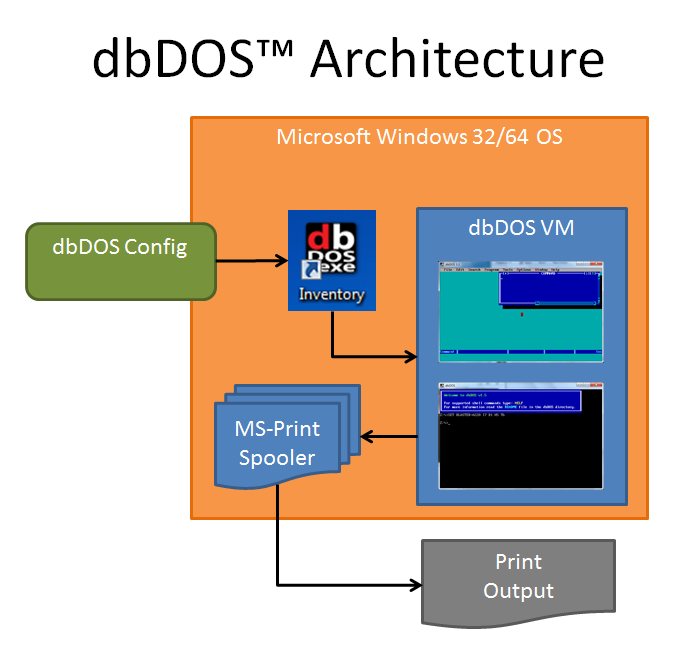
High Level Architecture dbDOS

- dbDOS CONFIG.EXE; The new dbDOS Configuration adds significant features to manage Windows shortcuts for running dBASE for DOS applications. One of the main comments with the initial dbDOS 1.0 product was that end-users wanted to be able to manage the shortcuts, they wanted to be able to delete them, and they wanted a way to share them. The new interface allows all of those features.
- Windows Shortcut; an icon that is used to represent a specific executable program configured to run inside the dbDOS VM. This will usually have a name under the icon on the desktop or on the start menu, which describes what program will be executed when selected.
- dbDOS VM Virtual Machine (dbDOS VM); The dbDOS VM or VM stands for Virtual Machine and with dbDOS it is a DOS emulation that allows products developed for DOS-based applications to run inside the virtual machine. The VM supports the Windows Operating Systems (XP, 2003, Vista, 2008, 7, 8, 8.1) in either 32- or 64-bit editions.
- Applications (.COM. EXE. BAT); One of the main goals of using the dbDOS Config.exe is to define a configuration that calls a . BAT, .COM, or a . EXE file to be executed inside the dbDOS VM.
- Command Prompt; dbDOS CONFIG.EXE also allows configurations that will take the user to the command prompt. From the command prompt the user can use it just like a DOS prompt.
- MS-Print Spooler; Output from the dbDOS VM is sent directly to the Print Spooler for printout
- Print Output; Output is printed on the hardware available to the dbDOS VM.

== Version history ==
Version	Released	Notes
1.0	2012-05-23	Initial release.
1.1	2012-06-22	Added ability to print to printers on the host machine.
1.5	September 25, 2012	Enhanced memory configurations increased overall performance.
1.5.1	2012-10-10	Enhanced printing capability to now closely resemble printouts from the 1980s and 1990s.
2.0	2013-08-23	New copy from Windows clipboard to dbDOS VM. New copy/paste from unique dbDOS buffer to Windows. Double the performance of the 1. x product. New Print Screen functionality introduced.
3.0	2014-05-02	Enhanced printing capability to now closely resemble printouts from the 1980s and 1990s. Easy DOS Configuration Wizard simplifies the setup and launching of a single dBASE program. Enhanced DOS SHELL functionality. Display for resolutions above 800x600 is 100% sharper and easier to read. Improved backup system that makes it easier to find the configuration.
4.0	2015-05-06	Live file system, better integration with Windows. New Look & Feel. 4DOS Integration - enhanced DOS SHELL functionality.
4N	2015-05-18	Live file system for better integration with Windows 64-bit machines. Networking capability with support for record locking. New Look & Feel. 4DOS Integration - Enhanced DOS SHELL functionality.
4.0	2015-05-20	dBase, LLC Announces support for Paradox for DOS Ecosystem dbDOS PRO 4 fully supports the Paradox for DOS related products and services. dbDOS PRO 4, a solution for supporting DOS-based applications on Windows Vista and above operating systems runs the Paradox environment, applications, and databases seamlessly on these operating systems.
4.0	2015-05-27	dBase, LLC Announces support for Lotus 1-2-3 for DOS dbDOS PRO 4 fully supports the Lotus 1-2-3 for DOS related products and services. dbDOS PRO 4, a solution for supporting DOS-based applications on Windows Vista and above operating systems runs the Lotus 1-2-3 environment and applications seamlessly on these operating systems.

== See also ==
- Comparison of platform virtualization software
- Desktop virtualization
- Platform virtualization
- Virtual disk image
- DOS
- Paradox (database)
- FoxPro
- Lotus 1-2-3
