= Jet Propulsion Laboratory Display Information System =

File management program written in FORTRAN

The Jet Propulsion Laboratory Display Information System (or JPLDIS) is a file management program written in FORTRAN.

JPLDIS is important because it was the inspiration and precursor to dBASE, arguably one of the most influential DBMS programs for early microcomputers.

== History ==
In the late 1960s, Fred Thompson at the Jet Propulsion Laboratory (JPL) of the California Institute of Technology (Caltech) was using a Tymshare product named RETRIEVE to manage a database of electronic calculators. In 1971 Fred collaborated with Jack Hatfield, a programmer at JPL, to write an enhanced version of RETRIEVE which became the JPLDIS project.

JPLDIS evolved into a file management program written in FORTRAN, running on a UNIVAC 1108 mainframe. Hatfield published two papers entitled "Jet Propulsion Laboratory Data Information System (JPLDIS)". The first paper was presented to the Univac Users Group in Dallas, TX (Feb. 1973) and the second paper was presented to the National Science Foundation conference on Data Storage and Retrieval Methods at the University of Missouri in Columbia, Missouri (July 1973). Hatfield left JPL in 1974 and the JPLDIS project was assigned to Jeb Long, another programmer at JPL, who added many advanced features plus a programming language.

In 1978, while at JPL, Wayne Ratliff wrote a database program in assembly language for CP/M based microcomputers to help him win the football pool at the office. He based it on Jeb Long's JPLDIS and called it Vulcan, after Mr. Spock of Star Trek. In late 1980, George Tate, of Ashton-Tate, entered into a marketing agreement with Wayne Ratliff. Vulcan was renamed to dBase, the price was raised from $50 to $695, and the software quickly became a huge success.

When a number of "clones" of dBase appeared in the 1990s, Ashton-Tate sued one of them, FoxPro, over copyrights. On December 11, 1990, Judge Hatter issued an order invalidating Ashton-Tate's copyrights in its own dBASE products. That ruling was based on a legal doctrine known as "unclean hands". Judge Hatter explained that Ashton-Tate knew that the dBase program development was based on JPLDIS, and that fact was kept hidden from the Copyright Office.

== See also ==
- dBase
- Vulcan (programming language)
