= Ashton-Tate =

American software company

Ashton-Tate Corporation
- Industry: Software
- Founded: August 1980; 46 years ago
- Founder: George Tate, Hal Lashlee
- Defunct: October 1991; 34 years ago
- Fate: Acquired
- Successor: Borland
- Headquarters: Torrance, California, US
- Products: dBASE, Framework, MultiMate, InterBase, RapidFile, and more
- Number of employees: 1,750

Ashton-Tate Corporation was a US-based software company best known for developing the dBASE database application and later acquiring Framework from the Forefront Corporation and MultiMate from Multimate International. It grew from a small garage-based company to become a multinational corporation. Once one of the "Big Three" software companies, which included Microsoft and Lotus, the company stumbled in the late 1980s and was sold to Borland in September 1991.

== History ==
=== Early history: dBASE II (1981–1983) ===
In 1978, Martin Marietta programmer Wayne Ratliff wrote Vulcan, a database application, to help him make picks for football pools. Written in Intel 8080 assembly language, it ran on the CP/M operating system and was modeled on JPLDIS, a Univac 1108 program used at JPL and written by fellow programmer Jeb Long. Ashton-Tate was launched as a result of George Tate and Hal Lashlee having discovered Vulcan from Ratliff in 1981 and licensing it. (Ashton was Tate's after-the-fact parrot, whose cage was kept in his Culver City office.) The original agreement was written on one page, and called for simple, generous royalty payments to Ratliff.

Tate and Lashlee had already built three successful start-up companies, by that time - spring 1981.

The three companies were:

- Discount Software Group, one of the first companies to sell microcomputer software through the mail,
- Software Distributors, aka Softeam (Glenn Johnson /CEO Mark Vidovich),
- Softwaire Centre International, the Original Software Store and franchised retail chain.

The first Software Store opened in May 1981. It was located on W. Pico Blvd, Los Angeles. Johnson's concept of retail store that sold software only, is the foundational retail concept of today's Apple & Google's App Stores.

By August 1984, SCI had grown to 113 stores, in 32 states.

Glenn Johnson was Co-Founder, C.E.O., and Chairman Of The Board of Directors of Softwaire Centre International. Tate & Lashlee were co-investors.

SCI was later sold to Wayne Green Publishing, publisher of Byte Magazine.

Vulcan was sold by SCDP Systems. The founders needed to change the name of the software, because Harris Corporation already had an operating system called Vulcan. Hal Pawluk, who worked for their advertising agency, suggested "dBASE", including the capitalisation. He also suggested that the first release of the product "II" would imply that it was already in its second version, and therefore would be perceived as being more reliable than a first release. The original manual was too complex from Pawluk's perspective, so he wrote a second manual, which was duly included in the package along with the first. Pawluk created the name for the new publishing company by combining George's last name with the fictional Ashton surname, purportedly because it was felt that "Ashton-Tate" sounded better, or was easier to pronounce, than "Lashlee-Tate".

dBASE II had an unusual guarantee. Customers received a crippleware version of the software and a separate, sealed disk with the full version; they could return the unopened disk for a refund within 30 days. The guarantee likely persuaded many to risk purchasing the $700 application. In 1981 the founders hired David C. Cole to be the chairman, president and CEO of their group of companies. The group was called "Software Plus". It did not trade under its own name, but was a holding company for the three startups: Discount Software, Software Distributors, and Ashton-Tate.

In June 1982 Cole hired Rod Turner as the director of OEM sales for Ashton-Tate.

=== IBM PC ===
dBASE II was ported to the IBM PC (i.e. the MS-DOS operating system) and shipped in September 1982.

With the growing popularity of ever-larger hard drives on personal computers, dBASE II turned out to be a commercial success. It was one of the first database products that ran on a microcomputer, and its programming environment (the dBASE language) allowed it to be used to build a wide variety of custom applications. Although microcomputers had limited memory and storage at the time, dBASE nevertheless allowed a huge number of small-to-medium-sized tasks to be automated. The value-added resellers (VARs) who developed applications using dBASE became an important early sales channel for dBASE.

By the end of the fiscal year ending in January 1982, the firm had revenues of almost $3.7 million with an operating loss of $313,000.

Among Cole's early acts was to hire an accountant to set up a financial system, install a management structure, and introduce processes to manage operations and orders. Cole's mission was "to shift the balance of power from those who understand how computers work to those who need what computers can do."

=== Ashton-Tate: IPO and dBASE III (1983–1985) ===
By the end of January 1983, the company was profitable. In February 1983 the company released dBASE II RunTime, which allowed developers to write dBASE applications and then distribute them to customers without them needing to purchase the "full" version of dBASE. The growth in revenue was matched by a growth in employees. The company hired its first Human Resources manager, put together its first benefits package, and moved headquarters to 10150 West Jefferson Boulevard in Culver City.

Such a market share would be the envy of Procter & Gamble or General Motors.

— PC Magazine on dBASE II's popularity, 1984

By early 1984 InfoWorld estimated that Ashton-Tate was the world's sixth-largest microcomputer-software company, with $35 million in 1983 sales. dBASE II reportedly had 70% of the microcomputer-database market, with more than 150,000 copies sold. Ashton-Tate published a catalog listing more than 700 applications written in the language, and more than 30 book, audio, video, and computer tutorials taught dBASE. Other companies produced hundreds of utilities that worked with the database, which Ratliff believed contributed to Ashton-Tate's success; "You might say it's because the software is incomplete. There are 'problems' with dBASE—omissions for other software developers to fill". He noted that "If they weren't with us, they'd be against us", and Cole promised to always notify third parties before announcing a new product or changing dBase's marketing. In May the company announced, and in July shipped, dBASE III as the successor to dBASE II. July also saw the release of Framework, an integrated office suite developed by Forefront Corporation and funded by Ashton-Tate. These were the company's first products released with copy protection schemes in an attempt to stop software piracy.

In 1985 Forrester Research considered Ashton-Tate, Lotus Development, Microsoft, and Borland the "Big Four" of personal computer software. By then a quarter of Ashton-Tate's $80 million in annual sales was from outside the United States; the company localized products in 11 European languages. Softletter estimated that in 1986 the "Big Three" of Lotus (9%), Microsoft (8%), and Ashton-Tate (6%, more than $200 million) together had 23% of total revenue of the top 100 microcomputer software companies. Of the 15 million Americans who used a personal computer in their job, one eighth used dBASE. Computer Intelligence estimated in 1987 that Ashton-Tate had 67% of the Fortune 1000 PC database market, with Microrim second at 9%. It also estimated a 40% share of the presentation software market, with Lotus second at 20%; 17% of the word processor market, second to 25% for IBM and MicroPro; and 1% share of the financial analysis market.

=== Ed Esber ===
Ashton Tate held a large company wide convention aboard the Queen Mary in Long Beach, California, in early August, 1984 and presented the new products like Friday! to hundreds of clients, and staff. Immediately after the Queen Mary convention, George Tate suddenly died of a heart attack at the age of 40 on August 10, 1984. David Cole on October 29 announced his resignation and left for Ziff-Davis, leaving Ed Esber to become CEO. Cole hired Esber because he was the marketing expert who launched VisiCalc and who built the first distribution channels for personal computer software. (VisiCalc was the first spreadsheet and is credited for sparking the personal computer revolution and was the first commercially successful personal computer software package.)

During Esber's seven-year tenure, Ashton Tate had its most prosperous years and a few of its most controversial. Under his leadership Ashton-Tate sales grew over 600% from $40M to over $318M.

In November, shortly after Esber took over, dBASE III version 1.1 was released to correct some of the numerous bugs found in the 1.0 release. As soon as the 1.1 release shipped, development focus turned to the next version, internally referred to as dBASE III version 2.0. Among other things, the 2.0 release would have a new kernel for increased speed, and new functions to improve application development.

Esber's relationship with Wayne Ratliff, however, was tumultuous, and Ratliff quit several months later. Eventually a group of sales and marketing employees left to join Ratliff at Migent Corporation to compete with Ashton Tate. Later (January 1987), Ashton-Tate would sue Migent for alleged misappropriation of trade secrets. Jeb Long took over as dBASE's main architect in Ratliff's absence.

In October 1985 the company released dBASE III Developer's Edition. Internally this release was known as version 1.2. It had some of the new features expected to be in the upcoming 2.0 release, including the new kernel and features primarily useful to application developers. Mostly, it was a release to appease developers waiting for 2.0 (dBASE III+).

In late 1985 the company moved its headquarters to the final location at 20101 Hamilton Avenue in Torrance. Development was spread throughout California, although dBASE development was centered at the Glendale offices.

=== dBASE III+ and third party clones (1986–1987) ===
dBASE III+, a version including character-based menus for improved ease-of-use, had troubles maturing and had to be recalled just prior to its release in early 1986 due to an incorrect setting in the copy-protection scheme. Despite this, dBASE III+ went on to be as successful as dBASE II had been, with $318 million in sales in 1987.

An addition to the lineup of third-party add-ons was the eventual release of dBASE compilers, which would take a dBASE project and compile it and link it into a stand-alone runnable program. This not only made the resulting project easy to distribute to end users, but it did not require dBASE to be installed on that machine. These compilers essentially replaced Ashton-Tate's own solution to this problem, a $395 per-machine "runtime" copy of dBASE, and thereby removed one source of their income. The most successful such compiler was Clipper, from Nantucket Software. Eventually a number of these were developed into full-blown dBASE clones.

Esber was upset with the companies that cloned dBASE products but was always supportive of third-party developers, whom he viewed as an important part of the dBASE ecosystem. He neither believed nor supported companies that cloned dBASE, in the process leveraging the millions of dollars his shareholders had paid to market dBASE. Starting with minor actions, he eventually went to great lengths to stop cloners with cease-and-desist letters and threats of legal action. At one industry conference he even stood up and threatened to sue anyone who made a dBASE clone, shouting "Make my day!".

=== dBASE IV: Decline and fall (1988–1990) ===
A November 1987 Computerworld survey gave Ashton-Tate a C grade for technology, B for product support, B− for management, B for customer relations, and C for marketing. Customers said that Ashton-Tate was slow to upgrade products, technical support was expensive but good, and the company was responsive to their needs. A Yankee Group analyst said that he was "appalled at the number of people who have left Ashton-Tate", indicating dissatisfaction with Esber's management; Computerworld said the departures "have been likened to mice jumping off a sinking ship".

A recurring point in the survey was Ashton-Tate's lack of new technology while being, one customer said, "essentially a one-product company"; dBASE III Plus was 63% of fiscal 1987 revenue. Although his company consistently reported higher revenue and earnings, Esber said "we are perceived as a technological laggard". dBASE, MultiMate, and Framework were all acquisitions, and not developed by Ashton-Tate. While competitors introduced new and improved products, dBASE had not been updated in 22 months.

dBASE IV 1.0 shipped in October 1988. It received good reviews, but by spring 1989 users discovered many bugs. In August 1989 Esber admitted that it had been shipped too early. It was almost two years before dBASE IV 1.1 finally shipped (in July 1990). During this time many customers took the opportunity to try out the legions of dBASE clones that had appeared recently, notably FoxPro and Clipper.

Sales of dBASE plummeted while FoxPro and (for those willing to move away from dBASE) Borland Paradox, DataEase, and R:Base benefited. Ashton-Tate had about 63% of the overall database market in 1988, and under 50% as of January 1990; by then the company had lost money for two quarters. Quarterly revenue at WordPerfect exceeded Ashton-Tate's, with the former taking the latter's rank as the third-largest PC software company. In August 1989, Ashton-Tate laid off 250 of its 1,700 employees. The Microsoft partnership for a version called the Ashton-Tate/Microsoft SQL Server also came to nothing, as Ashton-Tate's sales channels were not prepared to sell what was then a high-end database. The first version of SQL Server also only ran on IBM OS/2, which also limited its success. A version of dBASE that communicated directly with SQL Server, called dBASE IV Server Edition, was released in 1990, and was reviewed as the best available client for SQL Server (in both Databased Advisor and DBMS magazines), but the product never gained traction and was one of the casualties of the Borland acquisition. Microsoft eventually released Access in this role instead.

=== Sale to Borland (1991) ===
Esber had been trying to grow the company for years via acquisitions or combining forces with other software companies, including merger discussions with Lotus in 1985 and again in 1989. Other merger discussions that Ashton-Tate's board rejected or reached an impasse on included Informix, Cullinet, Computer Associates, Symantec and Microsoft. (Microsoft would later acquire Fox Software after Borland acquired Ashton-Tate and the United States Department of Justice forced Borland to not assert ownership of the dBASE language.)

In 1990 Esber proposed a merger with Borland.

=== Javelin ===
On April 10, 1986, Ashton-Tate signed a marketing deal with Javelin Software to distribute their financial modeling software named Javelin outside of the US and Canada.

=== Framework ===
The company's most successful attempt at a breakout was with Framework. Framework, like dBASE before it, was developed by a single author, Robert Carr, who felt that integrated applications offered benefits over a selection of separate apps doing the same thing. In 1983 he had a runnable demo of his product, and showed it to Ashton-Tate who immediately signed a deal to support development in exchange for marketing rights.

Framework was an integrated DOS-based document-based office suite with an interactive computer language named FRED that combined in an outliner a word processor, spreadsheet, mini-database application, charting tool, and a terminal program. Later versions also added e-mail support and a FRED Developer's toolKit with a FRED RunTime version that allowed developers to distribute free versions of Framework that run FRED applications. Framework also had the distinction of being available in over 14 languages, and it was more successful in Europe than in North America. Although DOS based, Framework supported a fully functional GUI based on character graphics (similar to Borland's OWL).

=== MultiMate ===
MultiMate was a word processor package created to copy the basic operation of a Wang dedicated word processor workstation on the PC. In the early 1980s many companies used MultiMate to replace these expensive single-purpose systems with PCs, MultiMate offering them an easy migration path. Although it wasn't clear at the time, this migration was largely complete by the time Ashton-Tate bought the company in December 1985 from Multimate International for about $20 million, in a transaction that an Ashton-Tate press release called "the largest ever in the microcomputer software industry".

=== Tate Publishing ===
The Tate Publishing division of Ashton-Tate initially published books about Ashton-Tate's software; in October 1988 it branched out to third-party software.

== Lawsuits ==
Esber had earlier threatened a group of dBASE users who were attempting to define a standard dBASE file format. With this standard, anyone could create a dBASE compatible system, something Esber simply wouldn't allow. But as soon as they were issued the cease-and-desist, they simply changed their effort to create a "new" standard known as "xBase".

Esber had previously decided to sue one of the clone companies involved, then known as Fox Software. By the time the case worked its way to court in 1990, Fox Software had released FoxPro and was increasing its market share. If the court case was successful, Ashton-Tate could stop FoxPro and use the precedent to stop the other clones as well, allowing dBASE to regain a footing and recover from the dBASE IV incident.

In December 1990 Judge Terrence J. Hatter, Jr. instead invalidated Ashton-Tate's copyright on dBASE and dismissed the case. It was learned that dBASE's copyright application did not disclose that it was a derivative of JPL's JPLDIS software, in the public domain.

When Borland acquired Ashton-Tate, the US Justice Department required that Borland not assert copyright claims to menu commands and the command language of dBASE. This paved the way for Microsoft to buy Fox Software.

== Products ==
- dBASE
- Framework – integrated word processor, outliner and spreadsheet application
- InterBase – purchased from Groton Database Systems
- MultiMate – DOS-based word processor
- RapidFile – database application written in MMSForth
- FullWrite Professional – word processor for Macintosh
