= VP-Info =

Database language and compiler

- Developer: Paperback Software International Ltd.
- Initial release: 1986
- Type: database language & compiler

VP-Info is a database language and compiler for the personal computer. VP-Info was a competitor to the Clipper and dBase applications in the late 1980s and 1990s. VP-Info was originally intended to run on MS-DOS, DR-DOS and the PC-MOS/386 operating system, but now is run on the vDOS, or DOSbox-X, emulators. The last release of VP-Info, a multi-tasking, multi-user version released in 1992 with a built-in compiler, and was named SharkBase, or simply "Shark".

== Origin ==
In the early 1980s, David Clark met George Gratzer, a mathematics professor at the University of Manitoba, at ComputerLand in Winnipeg where Gratzer was looking for someone who could program in dBase. Clark had been using dBase II, but was frustrated by its limitations for reporting on more than 2 tables at a time. While working for Standard Knitting (a client of Gratzer's and Clark's), David wrote a report generator called dComp that would allow up to six related data files to be in use at one time and run faster than the slow, dBase II. Clark and Gratzer subsequently formed a partnership in a company called "Sub Rosa" that developed dComp into a full dBase II compatible language/database called Max that had more speed and "power tools" than even dBase III contained. Clark designed and developed the program while Gratzer wrote the reference and tutorial manuals. This product was published by Paperback Software and sold over 30,000 copies (worldwide) in 1987 alone. The published reference manual for VP-Info was over 900 pages and the program was distributed in an extra thick back cover which was an innovation for all Paperback Software products at that time.

For programmers, Max had several interesting capabilities, including the ability to change field names easily, to represent fields in array form, automatically execute code while moving from field to field and many tools like cross tabs. With its built-in editor, a programmer could go from edit to executing the program in 2 keystrokes and back to editing the program with just 2 more.

== Marketing ==
Paperback Software International Ltd. acquired worldwide marketing rights to Max and launched it as VP-Info in 1986. Lotus Development Corp. objected to some of the features of VP-Planner 3D, a Lotus look-alike with a number of features beyond those of 1-2-3, and sued Paperback Software for copyright infringement in 1989. Though the lawsuit ultimately failed in the courts, Paperback Software eventually folded following the litigations.

Sub Rosa Inc. reacquired worldwide distribution rights to VP-Info shortly before it entered bankruptcy. Bursten and an associate, Bernie Melman of Toronto, established Sub Rosa Publishing Inc. in Toronto and Sub Rosa Corporation in Minneapolis and attempted to get VP-Info back into distribution. Since the name belonged to the bankrupt Paperback Software, however, the latest multi-user version was released under a new name, Shark (or SharkBase), published by Specialized Clinical Services in 1994.

== Technical ==
VP-Info can read and write all the common dBase/Clipper file formats, as well as exchange data with OpenOffice. VP-Info can read and write any type of dbf files (e.g. dBase II, III, IV, Clipper) at the same time. Unlike the older dBase file formats, VP-Info dbf files can have an unlimited number of records.

VP-Info has a unique built-in compiler for fast execution. On modern computers with fast SSDs, the speed increase is not as noticeable as compared to older PCs with removable discs. However, the speed and accuracy of the VP-Info/Shark compiler now makes it useful as a rapid "make" file in that large batches of related source files can be rapidly assembled and tested.

Like many DOS applications, VP-Info is available for free download. An online User's Manual for the latest distribution of VP-Info, SharkBase, is still maintained. VP-Info, and subsequent SharkBase versions, can run on 32-bit or 64-bit Windows, using a virtual machine or emulator to provide a usable environment. It has been reported that both VP-Info and Shark run under the latest Windows versions using either vDOS, or DOSbox-X, both recent forks of the earlier DOSBox MS-DOS emulator, and also on multi-user/multi-tasking systems with NetBIOS over TCP/IP such as PC-MOS/386. VP-Info dbf files can be opened, modified and saved by both OpenOffice Calc and LibreOffice Calc. The vDOS & DOSBox-X emulators offer access to all hardware output (printer) ports on the hosting Windows systems.

== Versions ==
VP-Info was produced in several different versions: VP-Info Level 1, SR-Info, VP-Info Professional, VP-Info Professional Network Edition, SharkBase, and SharkBase Network Edition. All are moderately compatible except for VP-Info Level 1 (because it's the oldest and "least perfect" version). The Network Editions, e.g. Sharkbase, run normally in single-user mode on most systems described. Multi-user/multi-tasking operations however depend on NetBios and/or Windows to run in multi-user, multi-tasking mode on a LAN network.

== Reception ==
InfoWorld in 1987 approved of VP-Info 1.0's low cost, fast performance, tutorial and documentation, and language enhancements, but found that most dBASE code would need modification. More seriously, it criticized the software's "serious error-handling problems" up to and including system crashes. InfoWorld concluded that VP-Info was "a poor value".
