= Visual FoxPro =

Programming language

- Visual FoxPro v9 running on Windows XP
- Developer: Microsoft
- Final release: v9.0 SP2 / October 16, 2007; 19 years ago
- Operating system: Windows 2000, Windows XP, and Windows Server 2003
- Platform: IA-32
- Available in: IDE: English, German, Spanish; Runtime: Above plus French, Chinese, Russian, Czech, Korean
- Type: Integrated development environment, programming language
- License: Commercial proprietary software
- Website: msdn.microsoft.com/vfoxpro

Visual FoxPro is a programming language that was developed by Microsoft. It is a data-centric and procedural programming language with object-oriented programming (OOP) features.

It was derived from FoxPro (which was itself descended from FoxBASE) which was developed by Fox Software beginning in 1984. Fox Technologies merged with Microsoft in 1992, after which the software acquired further features and the prefix "Visual". FoxPro 2.6 worked on Mac OS, DOS, Windows, and Unix.

Visual FoxPro 3.0, the first "Visual" version, reduced platform support to only Mac and Windows, and later versions 5, 6, 7, 8 and 9 were Windows-only. The current version of Visual FoxPro is COM-based and Microsoft has stated that they do not intend to create a Microsoft .NET version.

Version 9.0, released in December 2004 and updated in October 2007 with the SP2 patch, was the final version of the product. Support ended in January 2010 and extended support in January 2015.

== History ==
Visual FoxPro originated as a member of the class of languages commonly referred to as "xBase" languages, which have syntax based on the dBase programming language. Other members of the xBase language family include Clipper and Recital (database).

Visual FoxPro, commonly abbreviated as VFP, is tightly integrated with its own relational database engine, which extends FoxPro's xBase capabilities to support SQL query and data manipulation. Unlike most database management systems, Visual FoxPro is a full-featured, dynamic programming language that does not require the use of an additional general-purpose programming environment. It can be used to write not just traditional "fat client" applications, but also middleware and web applications.

In late 2002, it was demonstrated that Visual FoxPro can run on Linux under the Wine Windows compatibility suite. In 2003, this led to complaints by Microsoft: it was claimed that the deployment of runtime FoxPro code on non-Windows machines violates the End User License Agreement.

Visual FoxPro had a rapid rise and fall in popularity as measured by the TIOBE Programming Community Index. In December 2005, VFP broke into the top 20 for the first time. In June 2006 it peaked at position 12, making it (at the time) a "B" language. As of May 2025, Visual FoxPro holds position 29 on the TIOBE index.

In March 2007, Microsoft announced that there would be no VFP 10, thus making VFP9 (released to manufacturing on December 17, 2004) the last commercial VFP release from Microsoft. Service Pack 2 for Microsoft Visual FoxPro 9.0 was released on October 16, 2007. The support of Version 9 ended on January 13, 2015.

At the time of the end of life announcement, work on the next release codenamed Sedna (named after a recently discovered dwarf planet) which was built on top of the VFP9 codebase had already begun. "Sedna" is a set of add-ons to VFP 9.0 of xBase components to support a number of interoperability scenarios with various Microsoft technologies including SQL Server 2005, .NET Framework, Windows Vista, Office 2007, Windows Search and Team Foundation Server (TFS). Microsoft released Sedna under the Shared source license on the CodePlex site. Microsoft has clarified that the VFP core will still remain closed source. Sedna was released on January 25, 2008. As of March 2008, all xBase components of the VFP 9 SP2 (including Sedna) were available for community-development on CodePlex.

In late March 2007 a grassroots campaign was started by the Spanish-speaking FoxPro community at MásFoxPro ("MoreFoxPro" in English) to sign a petition to Microsoft to continue updating Visual FoxPro or release it to the community as open-source. On April 3, 2007, the movement was noted by the technical press.

On April 3, 2007, Microsoft responded to the petition with this statement from Alan Griver:

"We're very aware of the FoxPro community and that played a large part in what we announced on March 13th. It's never an easy decision to announce that we're not going to release another version of a product and it's one that we consider very carefully.

"We're not announcing the end of FoxPro: Obviously, FoxPro applications will continue to work. By some of our internal estimates, there are more applications running in FoxPro 2.6 than there are in VFP and FoxPro 2.6 hasn't been supported in many years. Visual FoxPro 9 will be supported by Microsoft through 2015.

"For Microsoft to continue to evolve the FoxPro base, we would need to look at creating a 64-bit development environment and that would involve an almost complete rewrite of the core product. We've also invested in creating a scalable database with SQL Server, including the freely available SQL Server Express Edition. As far as forming a partnership with a third-party is concerned, we've heard from a number of large FoxPro customers that this would make it impossible for them to continue to use FoxPro since it would no longer be from an approved vendor. We felt that putting the environment into open source on CodePlex, which balances the needs of both the community and the large customers, was the best path forward."

=== Version timeline ===
All versions listed are for Windows.

Version	Release date
Visual FoxPro 3.0	June 1995
Visual FoxPro 5.0	October 1996
Visual FoxPro 5.0a	October 1997
Visual FoxPro 6.0	18 May 1998
Visual FoxPro 7.0	27 June 2001
Visual FoxPro 8.0	1 February 2003
Visual FoxPro 8.0 Service Pack 1	7 October 2003
Visual FoxPro 9	20 December 2004
Visual FoxPro 9 Service Pack 1	8 December 2005
Visual FoxPro 9 Service Pack 2	16 October 2007

== Features ==
=== Programming language ===
The Visual FoxPro programming language is a high-level general-purpose procedural language. As such it is broadly similar to BASIC, Pascal and Python. Its features include:

- Structured programming constructs for branching (IF / ELSE / ENDIF, DO CASE / ENDCASE) and looping (FOR / ENDFOR, DO WHILE / ENDDO).
- Loosely-typed variables.
- Ability to call functions (both built-in and programmer-defined), with parameters passed by value or reference.
- Support for object-oriented programming (OOP), including inheritance, encapsulation and polymorphism.
- Structured Query Language (SQL). SQL code can be used interchangeably with native FoxPro code.

==== Code samples ====
* Display text in a standard message box
MESSAGEBOX('Hello World')

* Function call
f = Factorial(10)

* Function definition
FUNCTION Factorial(n)
LOCAL i, r

    r = 1
    FOR i = n TO 1 STEP -1
        r = r * i
    ENDFOR
    RETURN r
ENDFUNC

=== IDE ===
Visual FoxPro has an extensive integrated development environment (IDE), with tools to assist in application development, including:

- A command window into which the developer can enter commands for immediate execution. The output of the commands, if any, is displayed on the background screen or in an active window.
- Visual design tools (also called power tools). These allow the developer to visually design components such as class definitions, forms, reports, labels (Note: In this context, the term "label" refers to a printed mailing label rather than to a label on a form; it may be considered as a simplified version of a report.) and menus. These tools provide an alternative to writing code by hand. In earlier versions of FoxPro, tools similar to these generate program code which can then be edited by the programmer. In Visual FoxPro, on the other hand, the tools store details of the design in tables which VFP interprets at run time to produce the required components (Note: An exception is the menu designer, which does generate code.).
- A program editor which supports syntax highlighting, automatic indentation and code completion. These are implemented via Microsoft's Intellisense technology.
- A debugger which allows the developer to step through program code, to set breakpoints to interrupt program execution, to examine variables and to view the call stack.

=== Database ===
As well as being a tool for application development, Visual FoxPro serves as a database management system. The database is tightly integrated with the programming language and the IDE.

In earlier versions, as well as in other Xbase-based systems, each table in the database is held in its own physical file (along with associated files which hold indexes and memo [free-text] fields). The tables are independent of each other. The database does not store information about the relationships in the data, this being defined within the application. The data is stored in the DBF file format.

Visual FoxPro also supports this model, but does so mainly to maintain backward compatibility. It also introduces the concept of a "database container" (DBC). Here, the tables continue to be held in separate DBF files, but these are grouped in a container which stores information about the relationships, thus having some of the characteristics of a true relational database management system (RDBMS). It also supports primary keys, triggers and built-in validation rules.

The IDE includes interactive tools for creating and maintaining databases and tables, and for retrieving and editing data. These actions can also be implemented in program code, using either native FoxPro commands and functions or SQL.

==== Code samples ====
* Place customers with overdue balances into a temporary table

* FoxPro native code
CREATE CURSOR Overdue (Company C(10), Balance N(5), Due D)
USE Customer
SCAN 
 IF Due < DATE()
   SELECT Overdue
   APPEND BLANK 
   REPLACE Company WITH Customer.Company, Balance WITH Customer.Balance
 ENDIF 
ENDSCAN  

*SQL code
SELECT Company, Balance FROM Customer ;
 WHERE Due < DATE() ;
 INTO CURSOR Overdue
  && Note semi-colon indicates line continuation

== Bibliography ==
- Akins, Marcia; Kramek, Andy; Schummer, Rick (June 2000). Hosier, John (ed.). 1001 Things You Wanted to Know About Visual FoxPro. Milwaukee: Hentzenwerke Publishing. ISBN 0-96550-933-8.
- Akins, Marcia; Kramek, Andy; Schummer, Rick (November 2002). Dingle, Steve (ed.). MegaFox:1002 Things You Wanted to Know About Extending VFP. Milwaukee: Hentzenwerke Publishing. ISBN 1-930919-27-1.
- Chazottte, Kenneth (March 2004). Johnston, Joe (ed.). Build Your Own Framework with Visual FoxPro. Milwaukee: Hentzenwerke Publishing. ISBN 1-930919-53-0.
- Granor, Tamar E; et al. (April 2002). Hacker's Guide to Visual FoxPro 7.0. Milwaukee: Hentzenwerke Publishing. ISBN 1-930919-22-0.

== See also ==
- Harbour
- Visual Objects
