= Harbour (programming language) =

Computer programming language

- Paradigm: multi-paradigm: imperative, functional, object-oriented, reflective
- Family: xBase
- Designed by: Antonio Linares
- Developer: Viktor Szakáts and community
- First appeared: 1999; 27 years ago
- Stable release: 3.0.0 / 17 July 2011; 15 years ago
- Preview release: 3.2.0dev
- Typing discipline: Optionally duck, dynamic, safe, partly strong
- OS: Cross-platform
- License: Open-source GPL-compatible
- Filename extensions: .prg, .ch, .hb, .hbp
- Website: harbour.github.io

Dialects
- Clipper, Xbase++, FlagShip, FoxPro, xHarbour

Influenced by
- dBase, Clipper

Influenced
- xHarbour

Harbour is a computer programming language, used mainly to create database/business programs. It is a modernised cross-platform version of the older Clipper system, which in turn developed from the dBase database market of the 1980s and 1990s. It is free and open-source software which license is GNU General Public License (GPL) compatible.

Harbour code uses the same databases and can be compiled under a wide variety of platforms, including Windows, Linux, Unix variants, several Berkeley Software Distribution (BSD) descendants, macOS, Windows CE, Symbian, iOS, Android, VxWorks, OS/2 (including eComStation and ArcaOS), BeOS–Haiku, and AIX.

== History ==
The idea of a free software Clipper compiler had been arising for a long time and the subject occurred often in discussion on comp.lang.clipper. Antonio Linares founded the Harbour project and the implementation was started in March 1999. The name "Harbour" was proposed by Linares, it is a play on a Clipper as a type of ship. Harbour is a synonym for port (where ships dock), and Harbour is a port of the Clipper language.

In 2009, Harbour was substantially redesigned, mainly by Viktor Szakáts and Przemyslaw Czerpak.

== Database support ==
Harbour extends the Clipper Replaceable Database Drivers (RDD) approach. It offers multiple RDDs such as dBase (DBF), DBFNTX, DBFCDX, DBFDBT and DBFFPT. In Harbour, multiple RDDs can be used in one application, and new logical RDDs can be defined by combining other RDDs. The RDD architecture allows for inheritance, so that a given RDD may extend the functions of other existing RDD(s). Third-party RDDs, like RDDSQL, RDDSIX, RMDBFCDX, Advantage Database Server, and Mediator exemplify some of the RDD architecture features. DBFNTX implementation has almost the same functionality of DBFCDX and RDDSIX. NETIO and LetoDB provide remote access over Transmission Control Protocol (TCP).

Harbour also offers ODBC support by means of an object-oriented programming (OOP) syntax, and ActiveX Data Objects (ADO) support by means of OLE Automation (OLE). MySQL, PostgreSQL, SQLite, Firebird, Oracle are examples of databases which Harbour can connect to.

xBase technologies are confused often with relational database management system (RDBMS) software. While xBase was promoted as relational, xBase is more than a simple database system, as at the same time, xBase languages using purely DBF cannot provide the full features of a full RDBMS.

== Programming philosophy ==
Harbour aims to be written once, compiled anywhere. As the same compiler is available for all of the above operating systems, there is no need for re-coding to produce identical products for different platforms, except when operating system dependent features are used. Cross-compiling is supported with MinGW. Under Microsoft Windows, Harbour is more stable but less well-documented than Clipper, but has multi-platform ability and is more transparent, allows for more customisation and can run from a USB flash drive.

Under Linux and Windows Mobile, Clipper source code can be compiled with Harbour with very little adaptation. Most software originally written to run on Xbase++, FlagShip, FoxPro, xHarbour and others dialects can be compiled with Harbor with some adaptation. As of 2010 many efforts have been made to make the transition from other xBase dialects easier.

Harbour can use the following C compilers, among others: GCC, MinGW, Clang, Intel C++ Compiler (ICC), Microsoft Visual C++ (6.0+), Borland C++, Watcom C, Pelles C and Sun Studio.

Harbour can make use of multiple Graphical Terminal emulation, including console drivers, and Hybrid Console/GUIs, such as GTWvt, and GTWvg.

Harbour supports external GUI's, free (e.g. HBQt, HWGui, Mini-GUI (latest version based on Qt and QtContribs) and commercial (e.g. FiveWin, Xailer). HBQt is a library providing bindings to Qt. HBIDE application is a sample of HBQt potential.

Harbour is 100% Clipper-compatible and supports many language syntax extensions including greatly extended run-time libraries such as OLE, Blat, OpenSSL, Free Image, GD, hbtip, hbtpathy, PCRE, hbmzip (zlib), hbbz2 (bzip2), cURL, Cairo, its own implementation of CA-Tools, updated NanFor libraries and many others. Harbour has an active development community and extensive third party support.

=== Macro operator (runtime compiler) ===
One of the most powerful features of xBase languages is the Macro Operator '&'. Harbour's implementation of the Macro Operator allows for runtime compilation of any valid Harbour expression. Such a compiled expression may be used as a VALUE, i.e. the right side of an assignment (rvalue) or may be used to resolve the left side (lvalue) of an assignment, i.e. private, or public variables, or a database field.

Additionally, the Macro Operator may compile and execute function calls, complete assignments, or even list of arguments, and the result may be used to resolve any of the above contexts in the compiled application.

The latest Macro compiler can compile any valid Harbour code including code to per-process before compile.

Syntax:

 &( ... )

The text value of the expression '...' will be compiled, and the value resulting from the execution of the compiled code is the result.

 &SomeId

is the short form for &( SomeId ).

 &SomeId.postfix

is the short form of &( SomeId + "postfix" ).

=== Object-oriented programming ===
Programming in an OOP style is a broader issue than a specific library or a specific interface, but OOP programming is something many Clipper programmers have come to expect. CA-Clipper 5.2 and especially 5.3 added a number of base classes, and a matching OOP syntax. Libraries such as Class(y), FieWin, Clip4Win, and Top Class provide additional OOP functionality.

Harbour has OOP extensions with full support for classes including inheritance, based on Class(y) syntax. OOP syntax in Harbour is very similar to that of earlier Clipper class libraries so it should be possible to maintain legacy Clipper code with minimal changes.

== Syntax and semantics ==
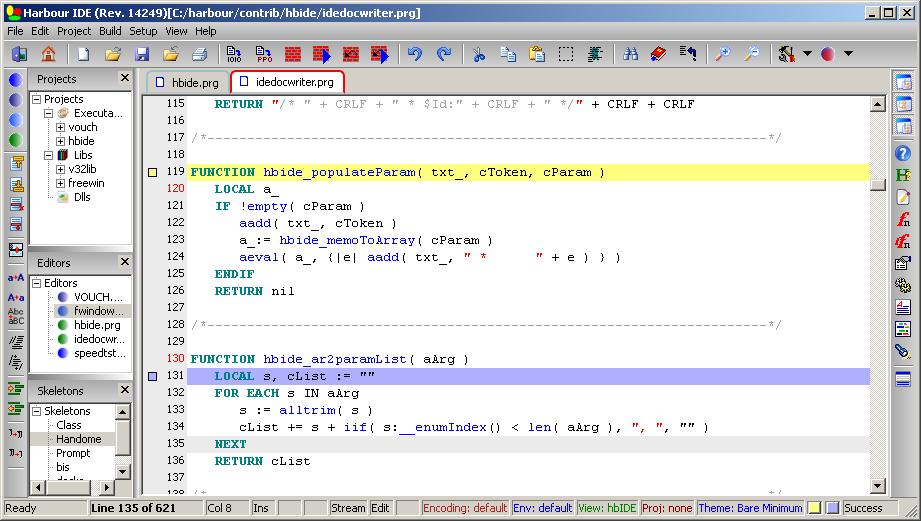
Harbour code on HBIDE

Harbour as every xBase language is case insensitive and can optionally accept keywords written just by their first four characters.

=== Built-in data types ===
Harbour has six scalar types: Nil, String, Date, Logical, Numeric, Pointer, and four complex types: Array, Object, CodeBlock, and Hash. A scalar holds a single value, such as a string, numeric, or reference to any other type. Arrays are ordered lists of scalars or complex types, indexed by number, starting at 1. Hashes, or associative arrays, are unordered collections of any type values indexed by their associated key, which may be of any scalar or complex type.

Literal (static) representation of scalar types:

- Nil: NIL
- String: "hello", 'hello', [hello]
- Date: 0d20100405
- Logical: .T., .F.
- Numeric: 1, 1.1, −1, 0xFF

Complex Types may also be represent as literal values:

- Array: { "String", 1, { "Nested Array" }, .T., FunctionCall(), @FunctionPointer() }
- CodeBlock: { |Arg1, ArgN| Arg1 := ArgN + OuterVar + FunctionCall() }
- Hash: { "Name" => "John", 1 => "Numeric key", "Name2" => { "Nested" => "Hash" } }

Hashes may use any type including other Hashes as the Key for any element. Hashes and Arrays may contain any type as the Value of any member, including nesting arrays, and Hashes.

Codeblocks may have references to Variables of the Procedure/Function>method in which it was defined. Such Codeblocks may be returned as a value, or by means of an argument passed BY REFERENCE, in such case the Codeblock will "outlive" the routine in which it was defined, and any variables it references, will be a DETACHED variable.

Detached variables will maintain their value for as long as a Codeblock referencing them still exists. Such values will be shared with any other Codeblock which may have access to those same variables. If the Codeblock did not outlive its containing routine, and will be evaluated within the lifetime of the routine in which it is defined, changes to its Detached Variables(s) by means of its evaluation, will be reflected back at its parent routine.

Codeblocks can be evaluated any number of times, by means of the Eval( BlockExp ) function.

=== Variables ===
All types can be assigned to named variables. Named variable identifiers are 1 to 63 ASCII characters long, start with [A-Z|_] and further consist of the characters [A-Z|0–9|_] up to a maximum of 63 characters. Named variables are not case sensitive.

Variables have one of the following scopes:

- LOCAL: Visible only within the routine which declared it. Value is lost upon exit of the routine.
- STATIC: Visible only within the routine which declared it. Value is preserved for subsequent invocations of the routine. If a STATIC variable is declared before any Procedure/Function/Method is defined, it has a MODULE scope, and is visible within any routine defined within that same source file, it will maintain its life for the duration of the application lifetime.
- PRIVATE: Visible within the routine which declared it, and all routines called by that routine.
- PUBLIC: Visible by all routines in the same application.

LOCAL and STATIC are resolved at compile time, and thus are much faster than PRIVATE and PUBLIC variables which are dynamic entities accessed by means of a runtime Symbol table. For this same reason, LOCAL and STATIC variables are not exposed to the Macro compiler, and any macro code which attempts to reference them will generate a runtime error.

Due to the dynamic nature of PRIVATE and PUBLIC variables, they can be created and destroyed at runtime and can be accessed and modified by means of runtime macros or by Codeblocks created on the fly.

=== Control structures ===
The basic control structures include all of the standard dBase, and Clipper control structures as well as additional ones inspired by the C or Java programming languages:

==== Loops ====
[DO] WHILE ConditionExp
   ...
   [LOOP]
   [EXIT]
END[DO]

FOR Var := InitExp TO EndExp [STEP StepExp]
   ...
   [LOOP]
   [EXIT]
NEXT

FOR EACH Var IN CollectionExp
   ...
   [Var:__enumIndex()]
   [LOOP]
   [EXIT]
NEXT

- The ... is a sequence of one or more Harbour statements, and square brackets [] denote optional syntax.
- The Var:__enumIndex() may be optionally used to retrieve the current iteration index (1 based).
- The LOOP statement restarts the current iteration of the enclosing loop structure, and if the enclosing loop is a FOR or FOR EACH loop, it increases the iterator, moving to the next iteration of the loop.
- The EXIT statement immediately terminates execution of the enclosing loop structure.
- The NEXT statement closes the control structure and moves to the next iteration of loop structure.

In the FOR statement, the assignment expression is evaluated prior to the first loop iteration. The TO expression is evaluated and compared against the value of the control variable, prior to each iteration, and the loop is terminated if it evaluates to a numeric value greater than the numeric value of the control variable. The optional STEP expression is evaluated after each iteration, prior to deciding whether to perform the next iteration.

In FOR EACH, the Var variable will have the value (scalar, or complex) of the respective element in the collection value. The collection expression may be an Array (of any type or combinations of types), a Hash Table, or an Object type.

==== IF statements ====
IF CondExp
   ...
[ELSEIF] CondExp
   ...
[ELSE]
   ...
END[IF]

... represents 0 or more statement(s).

The condition expression(s) has to evaluate to a LOGICAL value.

==== SWITCH statements ====
Harbour supports a SWITCH construct inspired by the C implementation of switch().

SWITCH SwitchExp
CASE LiteralExp
   ...
   [EXIT]
[CASE LiteralExp]
   ...
   [EXIT]
[OTHERWISE]
   ...
END[SWITCH]

- The LiteralExp must be a compiled time resolvable numeric expression, and may involve operators, as long as such operators involve compile time static value.
- The EXIT optional statement is the equivalent of the C statement break, and if present, execution of the SWITCH structure will end when the EXIT statement is reached, otherwise it will continue with the first statement below the next CASE statement (fall through).

==== BEGIN SEQUENCE statements ====
BEGIN SEQUENCE
   ...
   [BREAK]
   [Break( [Exp] )]
RECOVER [USING Var]
   ...
END[SEQUENCE]

or:

 BEGIN SEQUENCE
    ...
    [BREAK]
    [Break()]
 END[SEQUENCE]

The BEGIN SEQUENCE structure allows for a well behaved abortion of any sequence, even when crossing nested procedures/functions. This means that a called procedure/function, may issue a BREAK statement, or a Break() expression, to force unfolding of any nested procedure/functions, all the way back to the first outer BEGIN SEQUENCE structure, either after its respective END statement, or a RECOVER clause if present. The Break statement may optionally pass any type of expression, which may be accepted by the RECOVER statement to allow further recovery handling.

Additionally the Harbour Error Object supports canDefault, canRetry and canSubstitute properties, which allows error handlers to perform some preparations, and then request a Retry Operation, a Resume, or return a Value to replace the expression triggering the error condition.

Alternatively TRY [CATCH] [FINALLY] statements are available on xhb library working like the SEQUENCE construct.

=== Procedures and functions ===
[STATIC] PROCEDURE SomeProcedureName
[STATIC] PROCEDURE SomeProcedureName()
[STATIC] PROCEDURE SomeProcedureName( Param1 [, ParamsN] )

INIT PROCEDURE SomeProcedureName
EXIT PROCEDURE SomeProcedureName

[STATIC] FUNCTION SomeProcedureName
[STATIC] FUNCTION SomeProcedureName()
[STATIC] FUNCTION SomeProcedureName( Param1 [, ParamsN] )

Procedures and functions in Harbour can be specified with the keywords PROCEDURE, or FUNCTION. Naming rules are the same as those for Variables (up to 63 characters non-case sensitive). Both Procedures and Functions may be qualified by the scope qualifier STATIC to restrict their usage to the scope of the module where defined.

The INIT or EXIT optional qualifiers, will flag the procedure to be automatically invoked just before calling the application startup procedure, or just after quitting the application, respectively. Parameters passed to a procedure/function appear in the subroutine as local variables, and may accept any type, including references.

Changes to argument variables are not reflected in respective variables passed by the calling procedure/function/method unless explicitly passed BY REFERENCE using the @ prefix.

PROCEDURE has no return value, and if used in an Expression context will produce a NIL value.

FUNCTION may return any type by means of the RETURN statement, anywhere in the body of its definition.

An example procedure definition and a function call follows:

 x := Cube( 2 )

 FUNCTION Cube( n )
    RETURN n ** 3

=== Sample code ===
The typical "hello world" program would be:

  ? "Hello, world!"

Or:

  QOut( "Hello, world!" )

Or:

  Alert( "Hello, world!" )

Or, enclosed in an explicit procedure:

 PROCEDURE Main()

    ? "Hello, world!"

    RETURN

==== OOP examples ====
Main procedure:

 #include "hbclass.ch"

 PROCEDURE Main()

    LOCAL oPerson

    CLS

    oPerson := Person():New( "Dave" )
    oPerson:Eyes := "Invalid"
    oPerson:Eyes := "Blue"

    Alert( oPerson:Describe() )

    RETURN

Class definition:

 CREATE CLASS Person

    VAR Name INIT ""

    METHOD New( cName )
    METHOD Describe()

    ACCESS Eyes INLINE ::pvtEyes
    ASSIGN Eyes( x ) INLINE iif( HB_ISSTRING( x ) .AND. x $ "Blue,Brown,Green", ::pvtEyes := x, Alert( "Invalid value" ) )

    PROTECTED:

    VAR pvtEyes

 ENDCLASS

 // Sample of normal Method definition
 METHOD New( cName ) CLASS Person

    ::Name := cName

    RETURN Self

 METHOD Describe() CLASS Person

    LOCAL cDescription

    IF Empty( ::Name )
       cDescription := "I have no name yet."
    ELSE
       cDescription := "My name is: " + ::Name + ";"
    ENDIF

    IF ! Empty( ::Eyes )
       cDescription += "my eyes' color is: " + ::Eyes
    ENDIF

    RETURN cDescription

== Tools ==
- hbmk2 – Build tool like make
- hbrun – Shell interpreter for Harbour. Macro compiling allows to run any valid Harbour code as it's being compiled
- hbformat – Formats source code written on Harbour or another dialect according to defined rules
- hbpp – Pre-processor, a powerful tool which avoids typical problems found on C language per-processor
- hbi18n – Tools to localizing text on applications
- hbdoc – Creates documentation for Harbour

All tools are multi-platform.

== Development ==
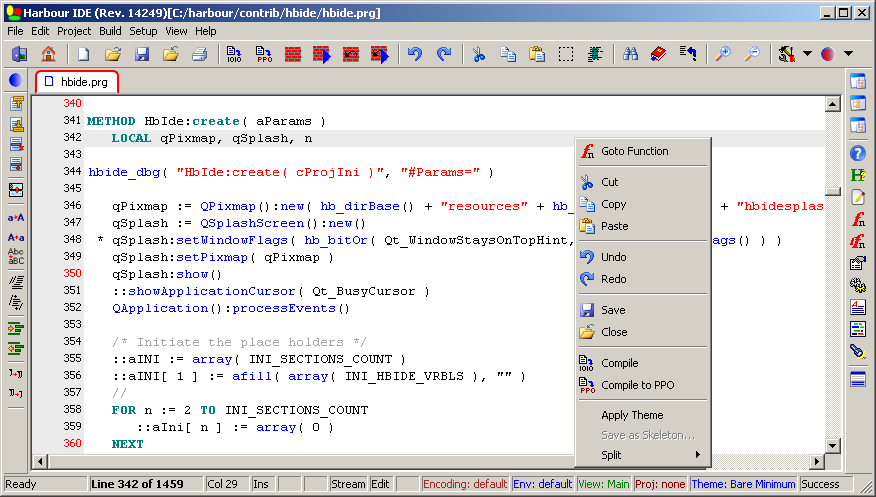
HBIDE look.

Today Harbour development is led by Viktor Szakáts in collaboration with Przemysław Czerpak who also contributes many components of the core language and supplementary components. HBIDE and some other components, especially HBQt, are developed by Pritpal Bedi. Other members of the development community send changes to the GitHub source repository. As of 2015 Harbour development is active and vibrant.

== xHarbour comparison ==
xHarbour is a fork of the earlier Harbour project. xHarbour takes a more aggressive approach to implementing new features in the language, while Harbour is more conservative in its approach, aiming first of all for an exact replication of Clipper behaviour and then implementing new features and extensions as a secondary consideration. It should also be noted that Harbour is supported on a wide variety of operating systems while xHarbour only really supports MS Windows and Linux.

The Harbour developers have attempted to document all hidden behaviour in the Clipper language and test Harbour-compiled code alongside the same code compiled with Clipper to maintain compatibility.

The Harbour developers explicitly reject extensions to the language where those extensions would break Clipper compatibility. These rejections were softened recently since the new Harbour architecture allows extensions out of the core compiler.

A detailed comparison between extensions implemented in Harbour and xHarbour can be found in the source repository of the project on GitHub.

== GUI libraries and tools ==
- hbide – Integrated Development Environment to help Harbour development and various xBase dialects
- PTSource IDE – Integrated Development Environment includes Harbour
- HwGui – Open Source cross-platform GUI library for Harbour
- HMG – Free, Open Source xBase Win32 / GUI Development System for Harbour
- MiniGUI – Free / Open Source xBase Win32 / GUI Development System (a Fork (software development) of both HMG and Harbour)
- ooHG – Object Oriented Harbour GUI – a fork "class based and oop programming" of HMG
- Marinas-GUI – Multi-Platform QT Based GUI Development Package for Harbour. Marinas-GUI downloads as a complete installation package for the chosen target platform (IDE, Version Control, Harbour/C Compiler, Libraries etc.) – Basically install and start coding and compiling

== See also ==
- Visual FoxPro
- Visual Objects
