= MultiMate =

Word processing software

- Developer: Multimate International
- Release: December 1982; 43 years ago
- Platform: MS-DOS
- Type: Word processor

MultiMate was a word processor developed by Multimate International for IBM Personal Computer MS-DOS computers in the early 1980s.

== History ==
With 1,000 computers, Connecticut Mutual Life Insurance was one of the first large-volume customers for the IBM Personal Computer (PC). Disliking existing software, it hired W. H. Jones & Associates to write a word processor for the computer that would not require retraining its employees, already familiar with Wang word processors. W. H. Jones' head Will Jones and five other developers created the software, delivering a beta release in 90 days. W. H. Jones retained the right to sell the program elsewhere, and WordMate appeared in December 1982. The company renamed itself to SoftWord Systems, then Multimate International, while renaming WordMate to MultiMate. Advertisements stated that MultiMate "mimic[ked] the features and functions of a dedicated system", and that it was "modeled after the Wang word processor". Like Connecticut Mutual, many customers purchased it because of the similarity with the Wang system.

MultiMate was designed for office correspondence where people typed what others hand-wrote with few changes. Multimate International focused on corporate sales, and did not market heavily to end-users. MultiMate was popular with insurance companies, law firms, other business computer users and US government agencies and the military. While the Wang WP keyboard differs from the original PC keyboard, MultiMate compensated by providing a large plastic template that clips onto the PC keyboard, and stick-on labels for the fronts of the PC keys. The template and labels color-code the combination keystrokes using the Shift, Alt and Ctrl keys with all ten of the PC's function keys and many of the character keys. Like Wang systems, MultiMate controls most editing operations with function keys, assigning four functions to each of the ten function keys, which IBM initially located in two columns at the left side of the keyboard. It also provides a "document summary" screen for each document, another Wang feature, which allows more sophisticated document-management than the brief file names allowed by MS-DOS and IBM PC DOS. As function selection through key-controlled screen-top drop-down menus was popularized by other programs, MultiMate added menus.

MultiMate's popularity rapidly grew. In January 1983 some employees were paid late because of slow sales, but two months later revenue grew 25-fold after good reviews appeared in magazines. The company's fiscal 1984 sales were $15 million or more, and by early 1985 MultiMate's installed base in companies was as large as market leader WordStar's. Jones planned to develop versions for the IBM System/36 minicomputer and other large IBM computers, but instead sold the company to Ashton-Tate in December 1985 for about $20 million. An Ashton-Tate press release called the acquisition "the largest ever in the microcomputer software industry". The company canceled the minicomputer plans, and focused on improving the PC version.

Other MultiMate products included foreign language versions of the software, e.g., "MultiTexto" in Spanish, a hardware interface card for file-transfer with Wang systems, a keyboard with extra function keys, and versions of MultiMate for different IBM PC compatible MS-DOS computers and PC networks from Novell, 3Com and IBM (Token Ring). Early attempts to create a MultiMate Data Manager and List Manager in-house never reached the market.

Multimate International developed the core word processing software and utilities (file conversion, printer drivers), but purchased and adapted sub-programs for spelling and grammar checking, list management, outlining and print-time incorporation of graphics in word processing documents (MultiMate GraphLink). In addition to rebranding such externally developed programs, Multimate rewrote the documentation for each program and adapted the program interfaces to more closely resemble the word processor. The last version of MultiMate was packaged with many of these add-on programs under the product name "MultiMate Advantage" to compete with other word processor software, especially IBM DisplayWrite for DOS — which Multimate International developers saw as their main competition in the business market — and to a lesser extent WordPerfect, the DOS incarnation of Microsoft Word, and the Samna word processor, which had its roots in another office word processing computer.

One of the first "clone" versions of MultiMate was bundled with an early portable PC made by Corona. Other versions were written to match PCs by RadioShack, Texas Instruments, Toshiba, the early GriD laptop and the IBM PCjr.

The detailed MultiMate word processor documentation, which quickly grew to three volumes, gives the product a solid "office product" feel, using high-quality paper with its main reference section presented in a padded binder with fold-out easel. (A company legend was that the MultiMate user manual was written first, by an experienced Wang WP manager, then the programmers were told to write software to match it, which is how the Wang WP was created.)

Early releases of MultiMate gave users unlimited access to a toll-free support number and a promise of low-cost upgrades, which contributed to its dedicated user population. Support policies later were brought in line with Ashton-Tate's standard practices.

MultiMate supports a variety of PC clones and hundreds of computer printers, each of which requires its own printer driver. The company's printer support is very strong with daisy-wheel and dot-matrix printers, but less so with PostScript fonts and laser printers.

While its close Wang emulation initially benefited MultiMate, the page-oriented design — preventing users from seeing the bottom of a page and the top of the next page at the same time — hurt sales. By 1988 it was no longer a market leader; PC Magazine wrote that "MultiMate feels increasingly like the last and most heavily burdened expression of an obsolete and irrelevant idea". By the early 1990s, the growing popularity of Microsoft Windows narrowed the market to a few supporting the operating system. Ashton-Tate never released a Windows version of MultiMate. It discontinued development efforts on VMS and Unix platforms and closed a development group in Dublin, Ireland. The product was dropped after the Ashton-Tate was purchased by Borland.

== Reception ==
PC in February 1983 stated that MultiMate "virtually remakes your computer into a Wang-like dedicated word processor", and that it was "very fast, easy to learn, and capable" with many features. The review noted the application's inability to use more than 128K of RAM, but praised the documentation and built-in help, and stated that many commands required half the keystrokes of the WordStar equivalent. The review concluded "MultiMate stands head and shoulders above many if not most [IBM PC word processors] ... an impressive entrant". The magazine reported in March 1984 that version 3.2 was noticeably slower than 3.11, which the company attributed to additional safeguarding of data.

BYTE in November 1984 was less positive. When evaluating MultiMate 3.11 and Leading Edge Word Processor, the magazine cited "irritating inconsistencies" in 3.11's user interface and documentation, a bug that "can wreck your files", and other flaws. The reviewer, an author of books on MultiMate and WordStar, concluded that both MultiMate and Leading Edge Word Processor were easy for novices to learn and had many features to avoid loss of data, but unsuitable for complex projects because of "hard to decipher, awkward, and sometimes dangerous" procedures. A separate review in the magazine described version 3.20 as being "very safe" because of many backups and safeguards and praised the formatting features, customization ability, and quality of the (very busy) toll-free help line. The review called MultiMate "the klunkiest package" of five tested word processors, because of the overemphasis on safety, criticized the built-in help and slow performance, and reported being unable to use the spell checker because of its poor quality. The reviewer mentioned that MultiMate version 3.30 was already shipping when the article went to press.

Edward Mendelson in summer 1985 in The Yale Review advised "journalists, essayists, and scholars, novelists, dramatists, and poets" who would be "wholesale cutting, adding, and rewriting" to avoid the "designed for office correspondence" and "excruciatingly slow" MultiMate. "Despite its menus, [MultiMate] manages to baffle intelligent beginners", he said.

Multimate Advantage II "has finally caught up with mainstream microprocessor word processing programs", John V. Lombardi of InfoWorld said in July 1987. He approved of its mail merge abilities, printer support, and documentation, but criticized its pagination, lack of indexing, and inability to handle documents larger than 128K. Lombardi concluded that MultiMate was "a very good product, and much improved over its earlier versions", below WordPerfect in functionality, but equal to Samna IV and superior to Officewriter 5.

Computer Intelligence estimated in 1987 that Ashton-Tate had 17% of the Fortune 1000 PC word processor market, second to IBM and MicroPro International at 25% each. A 1988 PC reader survey found that 7% used MultiMate, fourth among word processors. A 1990 American Institute of Certified Public Accountants member survey found that 5% of respondents used MultiMate as their word processor.

== See also ==
- List of word processors
