= DataEase =

Relational database management system (RDBMS)

DataEase is a relational database management system (RDBMS), and is considered a rapid application development tool for developing relationally-organized, data-intensive software applications for personal computers. DataEase was created in the early 1980s by software developers Arun Gupta and Joseph Busch. The first version of the software was released in 1981 by Software Solutions Inc. The principals sold the company to Sapphire International Corporation of the United Kingdom in 1991. Sapphire continues to develop and market the product. There are two distinct product arcs in DataEase's history: DataEase for DOS and DataEase for Windows.

As of September 2024, LegEasy9 (DataEase for Window version 9) available for purchase online at DataEase . LegEasy9 comes with 100's of new functions and improvements in the printing area.

== DataEase for DOS ==
Originally called Datamaster, DataEase's early hallmark was the ease with which non-programmers found they could rapidly develop useful software applications. DataEase's design emphasized the visual design of screen forms and reports while hiding almost all of the arcane details such as properties of the underlying data structure. In addition, complex data management processes that would typically require a multitude of complex steps to complete with traditional programming tools were handled automatically and transparently as a user made changes to their application. For example, when editing an existing form, if the user removed a field, added another, indexed another and changed the data type of yet another, the necessary steps required to reflect those changes in the data structure underlying the form were automatically and non-destructively applied when the form was saved.

Report writing was similarly streamlined. The user simply defined access to the desired data using a simple procedural language known as DataEase Query Language (DQL). A prompting script editor, which permitted any user to instantly create DQL script with no prior knowledge of DQL syntax, remains one of DataEase's most overlooked and beneficial features. One was not required to memorize details about the application's components or DQL syntactical construction prior to writing a valid DQL script.

=== Sample DQL Script ===
 For Employees with (Salary < 50000 and YearsOfService > 4 and LastReviewGrade > 85)
 List Records
   LastName in order;
   FirstName ;
   CurrentSalary : item sum ;
   CurrentSalary * data-entry EnterRaiseAmount : item sum .
 Modify Records
   CurrentSalary := CurrentSalary * data-entry EnterRaiseAmount .

In addition to simplified definition of data forms, reports and procedures, DataEase for DOS provided facilities for defining an application's user access, navigational menus, multi-format importing of data from other sources, data exporting, data backup and restoration, system documentation and user help, backing up and restoring data and integrating external programs into the application. DataEase for DOS applications provided record-level locking meaning they could be accessed simultaneously by many other users.

DataEase on Unix

A group in Palo Alto around 1991 came up with a product they named XDOS.

It was binary-level conversion software that would transfer executable DOS files onto a prescribed Unix version and thereby DataEase for DOS became DataEase for Unix. Everything was transported so that the application made under DataEase for DOS would be ported to the UNIX environment - everything, including data.

XDOS was able to be applied against an array of popular applications at the time (in the professional sense as PCs were, then, rarely seen outside of the IT Department or on desktops at work, in the library or occasionally in the home of an IT professional developer.

Some of the XDOS compatible applications included DataEase, MS Word, Lotus 123 (spreadsheet) and others.

XDOS was provided for specific nominated variants of the UNIX system. Not for HP but most others. The UNIX variant maker had to agree to hand over certain required technicals that HP, in the day, found impossible to agree with. Just about all variants of UNIX had no such trouble or met the criteria due to compatibility between UNIX/XENIX variants.

The XDOS developers went on to develop the X Window System for UNIX.

When the decision eventually came that the DataEase for DOS would not be able to port to DataEase for Windows, the arse fell from the massive worldwide user base, in 13 languages including Russian and Japanese

=== DataEase at Work ===
DataEase for DOS gained an eclectic following among application developers and those responsible for managing proprietary business processes in the corporate world. The DataEase Resource Guide, published by DataEase International in the late 1980s lists approximately two hundred commercially available applications spanning specialized domains from Waste Management to Law Enforcement. Indeed, many corporate users deployed business-critical applications using DataEase including organizations such as NASA, Ford Motor Co., Citimortgage (FKA Lomas Financial Corporation), and the American Automobile Club.

DataEase for DOS was distributed worldwide and, according to information provided by Sapphire International, peaked at an installed base of approximately 2 million seats. Despite the fact that Sapphire ceased distribution of DataEase for DOS in 2003, a significant number of DataEase for DOS applications remained in active use worldwide as of 2008.

=== Awards ===
DataEase for DOS was recognized with a number of prestigious industry awards, including:

- PC Magazine Editor's Choice: 1986, 1988, 1989
- PC Magazine Best of Award: 1988, 1990
- PC Week Labs Database Challenge development Shootout - Olympia PC User show: Winner 1989 (Julian Brearley & Gary Cowan), 1990 (Julian Brearley & Simon Irwin)

== DataEase for Windows ==
DataEase for Windows (DFW) is a rapid application development tool for constructing Windows database applications. DataEase for Windows abandoned many of the intuitive features of its DataEase for DOS ancestor. The DataEase for Windows product was designed and positioned to address the needs of the more technical programmer. This was due to the belief at the time that soon all data would be stored in SQL-based client-server platforms, and that DataEase itself would evolve into a SQL development tool.

DataEase for Windows was initially released in 1994, as a follow up to DataEase Express, which lacked the DQL procedural language. The user interface was overhauled and the automatic creation of data structures along with screens (Forms) was abandoned. Despite the fact that DataEase for Windows incorporated both an automated migration tool (from DE DOS 4.53) and the ability to directly acquire tables and data from DFD5, many long-time DataEase for DOS users found it difficult to break out from the hierarchical CUI paradigm and make best use of the new tools in the Windows product.

DataEase for Windows' acceptance by existing DataEase for DOS users was therefore significantly hindered, and those who delayed the decision to move and instead upgraded to more recent DOS versions found that while they could share data with Windows versions, to achieve a full Windows application, forms and report layouts all had to be re-created from scratch in DFW. Even though business rules could be imported with the tables, and DQL's could be imported also either by cutting and pasting or by the 'DOS report' facility in DFW version 5.5 on, the difficulty still remained that an application designed with a work-flow for the single-tasking DOS environment was frequently unsuited for the multi-session Windows environment. The difficulty and the considerable expense posed by the task of re-writing their applications forced many otherwise-satisfied DataEase users to reconsider their choice of the DataEase platform.

Conversely, new users of DataEase for Windows with no previous experience found it an effective tool, and some important systems were written using it during the second half of the 1990s.

Since DataEase version 7 (2006) interoperability has been abandoned as being too restrictive for the product's development to be a good 'Windows citizen'.

== DataEase 7.2 ==
In 2008 a new DataEase development team was appointed under the leadership of Ulrik Krohn to take DataEase into a new era which will eventually culminate in a completely web based product.

DataEase 7.2 was officially launched on July 1, 2009. This version is the first to use the 64-bit operating system and was extensively reworked to contain more than 1,000 improvements and fixes

The release of 7.2 also marked the time when DataEase International Ltd. became once again an independent product company solely focused on the product and its development.
