= TOTVS =

Brazilian software company

- Type: Public
- Traded as: B3: TOTS3
- Industry: Software
- Founded: 1983
- Founder: Laércio Cosentino and Ernesto Haberkorn
- Headquarters: São Paulo, São Paulo, Brazil
- Key people: Dennis Herszkowicz (CEO)
- Products: ERP software
- Revenue: ▲US$ 1.0 billion (2025)
- Net income: ▲US$ 164.3 million (2025)
- Number of employees: 12,000
- Subsidiaries: Bematech; Virtual Age; PRX; PC Sistemas
- Website: totvs.com

TOTVS S.A. is a Brazilian software company based in São Paulo. TOTVS was initially formed from the merger of Microsiga and Logocenter. TOTVS is the leader in the Brazilian ERP market according to the FGV (Getúlio Vargas Foundation) and, in addition to Brazil, has offices in the United States, Portugal and Latin America.

== History ==
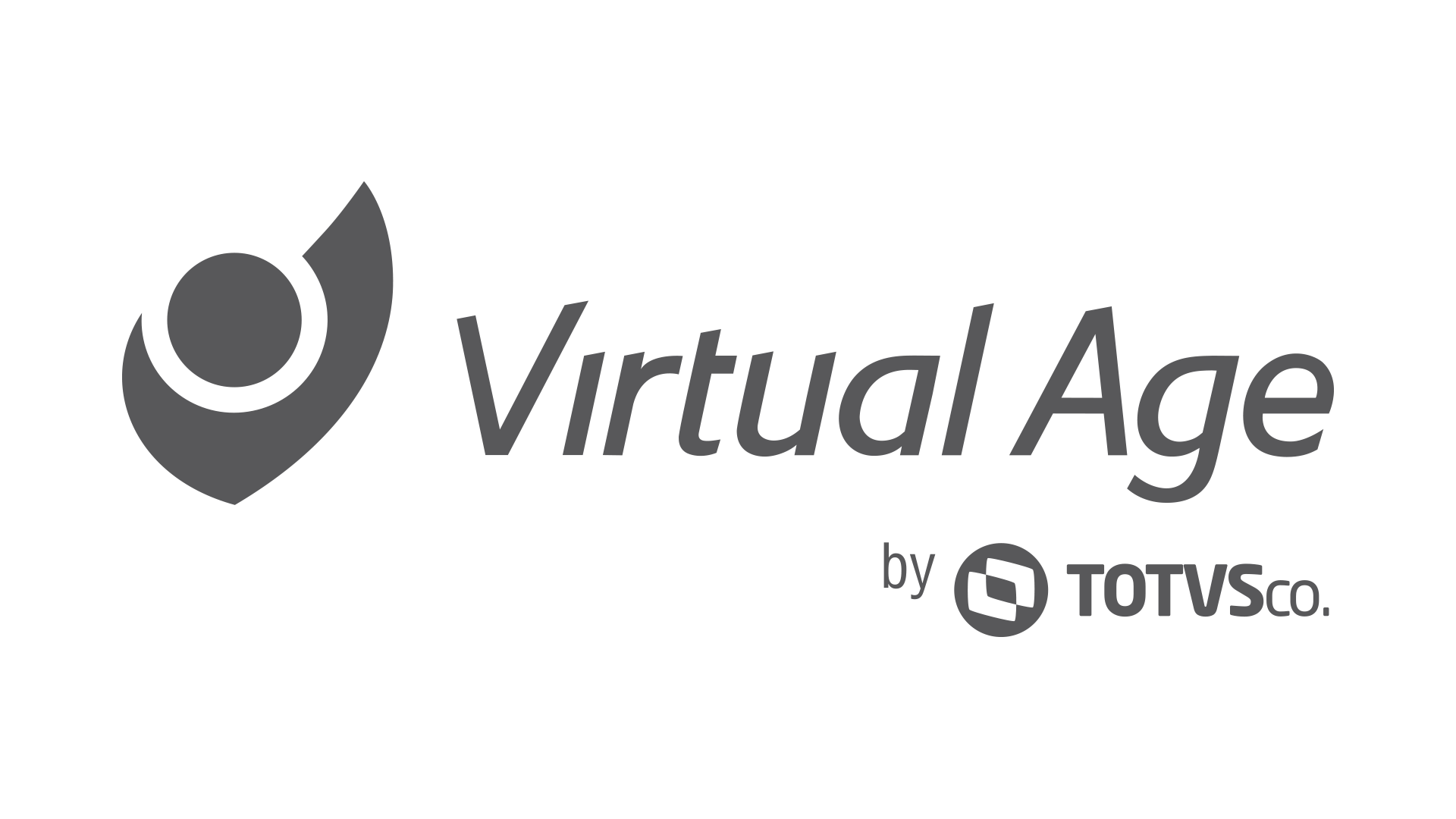
Virtual Age, subsidiary of TOTVS.

In 1983, entrepreneur Laércio Cosentino was 23 years old and was director of data processing company Siga, a company created by Ernesto Haberkorn. Cosentino and Haberkorn opened Microsiga, a software company for small and medium-sized companies, and then became equal partners in the new company. Microsiga merged with Siga in 1989, and in 2005 the company changed its name to TOTVS.

TOTVS acquired more than 50 corporative software manufacturers like Datasul, RM Sistemas, Midbyte, Logocenter, BCS, among others. TOTVS opened a California operation within the University of California campus, TOTVS Labs, a cloud computing solutions research center, in 2011. The following year, it opened an office in Silicon Valley, California. TOTVS acquired seven Brazilian software companies in 2013; PRX (current TOTVS Agroindústria), ZeroPaper, RMS, 72% of Ciashop, Seventeen Tecnologia da Informação, W & D Participações, parent company of PC Sistemas and PC Informática, and the American company GoodData.

In May 2014, bought by 75.1 million dollars, the Paraná-based company Virtual Age that works in the development of software in the cloud for the companies of textile fashion and clothing. On August 14, 2015, Totvs announced the purchase of 100% of the commercial automation company Bematech for R$ 550 million.

== Offices ==
TOTVS has 66 units and 11 centres of R&D in Brazil - São Paulo, Rio de Janeiro, Brasília, Belo Horizonte, Salvador, Recife, Fortaleza, Manaus, Porto Alegre, Joinville and Curitiba -, 3 centres of R&D in the United States - Weston, Florida, Raleigh, North Carolina and Mountain View, California (TOTVS Labs) - 4 units with 1 R&D center in Latin America - Argentina, Bolivia, Chile, Colombia, Dominican Republic, Ecuador, Mexico, Paraguay, Peru and Uruguay - as well as an office in Portugal and New York.
