= FoxPro =

Programming language

Cover of the FoxPro 2.6 Developer's Guide

FoxPro is a text-based procedurally oriented programming language and database management system (DBMS), and it is also an object-oriented programming language, originally published by Fox Software and later by Microsoft, for MS-DOS, Windows, Macintosh, and UNIX. The final published release of FoxPro was 2.6. Development continued under the Visual FoxPro label, which in turn was discontinued in 2007.

== Description ==
FoxPro was derived from FoxBase (Fox Software, Perrysburg, Ohio), which was in turn derived from dBase III (Ashton-Tate) and dBase II.

FoxPro is both a DBMS and a relational database management system (RDBMS), since it extensively supports multiple relationships between multiple .dbf files (tables). However, it lacks support for transactional processing.

FoxPro was sold and supported by Microsoft after they acquired Fox Software in its entirety in 1992. At that time there was an active worldwide community of FoxPro users and programmers. FoxPro 2.6 for UNIX (FPU26) has been successfully installed on Linux and FreeBSD using the Intel Binary Compatibility Standard (ibcs2) support library.

== Reception ==
Tom Campbell of Compute! in 1993 praised FoxPro's rapid application development: "You can create a complete database browser with a mousing, menuing interface in well under 100 lines--including a custom data entry screen with error checking". He concluded that the $1000 price for FoxPro and runtime library was "without a doubt" worthwhile, as it "could mean that you'll make that $1,000 back--on your first job". Richard O'Reilly of the Los Angeles Times also approved of the no-code development. He said that FoxPro 2.5 was preferable to Microsoft Access for most, being both faster and easy to learn, and also faster than Borland Paradox.

A 1990 American Institute of Certified Public Accountants member survey found that 2% of respondents used FoxBase as their database.

dBASE creator Wayne Ratliff in 2007 praised FoxPro: "FoxPro is more rigorous in its data approach than dBASE II was. It's—maybe user-friendly isn't the right word—it's just friendly. It's easy to do stuff".

Chuck Hinkle reviewed the Mac version in The Apple Barrel and complained that it wasn't more object-based and that the add-ins that simplify its programming on the PC don't exist on the Mac and require more work than using FileMaker or Helix (database). His final assessment was: "I would stick with FileMaker for simple databases and stick with Helix Express and 4th Dimension for sophisticated database applications for the Macintosh." However, he recommended it for Mac users who have to program for PC users or who need to run dBASE programs.

== Version information ==
=== Operating system compatibility ===
Extant Versions by OS
Version	FP 2.0	FP 2.5	FP 2.6
MS-DOS	Yes	Yes	Yes
Windows 3.0 to Windows ME	Yes	Yes	Yes
Windows NT 3.1 to Windows 2000 (x86)	No	No	Yes
Windows XP to 10 (x86)	No	No	Yes
Windows XP to Windows 11 (x86-64)	No	No	No
Classic Mac OS	Yes	Yes	Yes
SCO UNIX	Yes	Yes	Yes
Linux and FreeBSD	Yes	Yes	Yes

=== Technical aspects ===
FoxPro 2 includes the "Rushmore" optimizing engine, which uses indices to accelerate data retrieval and updating. Rushmore technology examines every data-related statement and looks for filter expressions. If one is used, it looks for an index matching the same expression.

FoxPro 2 was originally built on Watcom C/C++, which used the DOS/4GW memory extender to access expanded and extended memory. It could also use almost all available RAM even if no HIMEM.SYS was loaded.

=== Version timeline ===
Version	Returned by VERSION()	File Size	Release date
FPW 2.6a	FoxPro 2.6a for Windows	2.44 Mb	September 28, 1994
FPM 2.6a	FoxPro 2.6a for Macintosh	Unknown	August 1994
FPD 2.6a	FoxPro 2.6a for DOS	1.79 Mb	August 1994
FPW 2.6	FoxPro 2.6 for Windows	2.52 Mb	March 9, 1994
FPM 2.6	FoxPro 2.6 for Macintosh	Unknown	1993
FPD 2.6	FoxPro 2.6 for DOS	1.83 Mb	March 1994
FPU 2.6	FoxPro 2.6 for Unix	2.3 Mb	1993
FPW 2.5	FoxPro 2.5 for Windows	1.63 Mb	January 1993
FPD 2.5	FoxPro 2.5 for DOS	509.0 Kb	February 1993
FPD 2.0	FoxPro 2.0 for DOS	488.7 Kb	July 1992
FPD 1.0	FoxPro 1.0 for DOS	343.2 Kb	November 1991
