= DBase =

Database management system

- Paradigm: Imperative, declarative
- Developer: Cecil Wayne Ratliff
- First appeared: 1979; 47 years ago
- Final release: dBASE 2019 / 2019; 7 years ago
- Implementation language: C
- OS: Microsoft DOS; Microsoft Windows
- License: Proprietary
- Website: www.dbase.com

Influenced by
- RETRIEVE, JPLDIS

Influenced
- Clipper, WordTech products, Harbour. FoxBASE+, FoxPro, Visual FoxPro, VP-Info

dBase (also stylized dBASE) was one of the first database management systems for microcomputers and the most successful in its day. The dBase system included the core database engine, a query system, a forms engine, and a programming language that tied all of these components together.

Originally released as Vulcan for PTDOS in 1978, the CP/M port caught the attention of Ashton-Tate in 1980. They licensed it, re-released it as dBASE II, and later ported it to IBM PC computers running DOS. On the PC platform in particular, dBase became one of the best-selling software titles for a number of years. A major upgrade was released as dBase III and ported to a wider variety of platforms, including UNIX and VMS. By the mid-1980s, Ashton-Tate was one of the "big three" software publishers in the early business-software market, along with Lotus Development and Microsoft.

Starting in the mid-1980s, several companies produced their own variations on the dBase product and especially the dBase programming language. These included FoxBASE+ and its successor FoxPro, Clipper, and other so-called xBase products. Many of these were technically stronger than dBase, but could not push it aside in the market. This changed with the poor reception of dBase IV, whose design and stability were so lacking that many users switched to other products.

In the early 1990s, xBase products constituted the leading database platform for implementing business applications. The size and impact of the xBase market did not go unnoticed, and within one year, the three top xBase firms were acquired by larger software companies:

- Borland purchased Ashton-Tate
- Microsoft bought Fox Software
- Computer Associates acquired Nantucket

Then the smaller, but still popular, xBase products were acquired as their parents ran into market challenges:

- SubRosa Inc acquired VP-Info

By the opening decade of the 21st century, most of the original xBase products had faded from prominence and many had disappeared entirely. In 2022, products known as dBase still existed, owned by dBase LLC. The Register reported that dBase's website ceased to operate in 2026.

== History ==
=== Origins ===
In the late 1960s, Fred Thompson at the Jet Propulsion Laboratory (JPL) was using a Tymshare product named RETRIEVE to manage a database of electronic calculators, which were at that time very expensive products. In 1971, Thompson collaborated with Jack Hatfield, a programmer at JPL, to write an enhanced version of RETRIEVE, which became the JPLDIS project. JPLDIS was written in FORTRAN on the UNIVAC 1108 mainframe, and was presented publicly in 1973. When Hatfield left JPL in 1974, Jeb Long took over his role.

While working at JPL as a contractor, C. Wayne Ratliff entered the office football pool. He had no interest in the game as such, but felt he could win the pool by processing the post-game statistics found in newspapers. In order to do this, he turned his attention to a database system and, by chance, came across the documentation for JPLDIS. He used this as the basis for a port to PTDOS on his kit-built IMSAI 8080 microcomputer, and called the resulting system Vulcan (after the home planet of Mr. Spock on Star Trek).

=== Ashton-Tate ===
George Tate and Hal Lashlee had built two successful start-up companies: Discount Software, which was one of the first to sell PC software programs through the mail to consumers, and Software Distributors, which was one of the first wholesale distributors of PC software in the world. They entered into an agreement with Ratliff to market Vulcan, and formed Ashton-Tate (the name Ashton was chosen purely for marketing reasons) to do so. Ratliff ported Vulcan from PTDOS to CP/M. Hal Pawluk, who handled marketing for the nascent company, decided to change the name to the more business-like "dBASE". Pawluk devised the use of lower case "d" and all-caps "BASE" to create a distinctive name. Pawluk suggested calling the new product version two ("II") to suggest it was less buggy than an initial release. dBASE II was the result and became a standard CP/M application along with WordStar and SuperCalc.

In 1981, IBM commissioned a port of dBASE for the then-in-development PC. The resultant program was one of the initial pieces of software available when the IBM PC went on sale in the fall of 1981. dBASE was one of a few "professional" programs on the platform then, and became a huge success. The customer base included not only end-users, but an increasing number of "value added resellers", or VARs, who purchased dBASE, wrote applications with it, and sold the completed systems to their customers. The May 1983 release of dBASE II RunTime further entrenched dBASE in the VAR market by allowing the VARs to deploy their products using the lower-cost RunTime system.

Although some critics stated that dBASE was difficult to learn, its success created many opportunities for third parties. By 1984, more than 1,000 companies offered dBASE-related application development, libraries of code to add functionality, applications using dBASE II Runtime, consulting, training, and how-to books. A company in San Diego (today known as Advisor Media) premiered a magazine devoted to the professional use of dBASE, Data Based Advisor; its circulation exceeded 35,000 after eight months. Ashton-Tate said that addons covered "every area from hog farming to yacht racing". All of these activities fueled the rapid rise of dBASE as the leading product of its type; by early 1984 Ashton-Tate stated that it had sold more than 150,000 copies of dBASE II.

=== dBase III ===
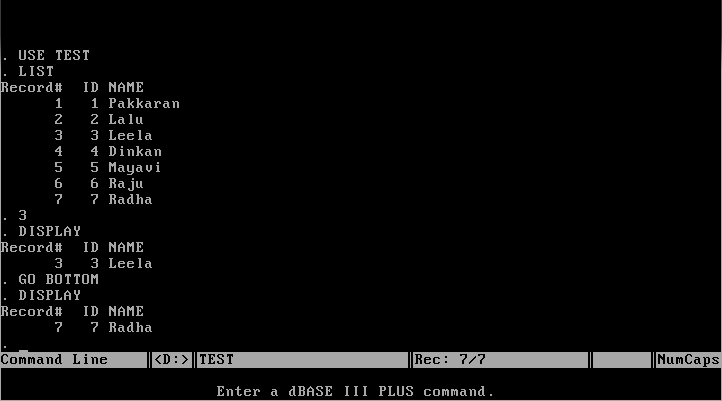
Screenshot of Dbase III Plus

As platforms and operating systems proliferated in the early 1980s, the company found it difficult to port the assembly language-based dBase to target systems. This led to a rewrite of the platform in the C programming language, using automated code conversion tools. The resulting code worked, but was essentially undocumented and inhuman in syntax due to the automated conversion, a problem that would prove to be serious in the future.

In May 1984, the rewritten dBase III was released. Although reviewers widely panned its lowered performance, the product was otherwise well reviewed. After a few rapid upgrades, the system stabilized and was once again a best-seller throughout the 1980s, and formed the famous "application trio" of PC compatibles (dBase, Lotus 123, and WordPerfect). By the fall of 1984, the company had over 500 employees and was taking in US$40 million a year in sales (equivalent to $124 million in 2025), the vast majority from dBase products.

==== Cloning ====
There was also an unauthorized clone of dBase III called Rebus in the Soviet Union. Its adaptation to the Russian language was reduced to the mechanical replacement of the name, the russification of the help files and the correction of the sorting tables for the Russian language.

=== dBase IV ===
Introduced in 1988, after delays, dBase IV had "more than 300 new or improved features". By then, FoxPro had made inroads, and even dBase IV's support for Query by Example and SQL were not enough. dBase IV added a built-in screen generator; in dBASE III and earlier, third-party screen generators were available, including Luis Castro's ViewGen which was purchased by Fox Software and bundled with FoxPro 1.0 as FoxView.

Along the way, Borland, which had bought Ashton-Tate, brought out a revised dBase IV in 1992 but with a focus described as "designed for programmers" rather than "for ordinary users".

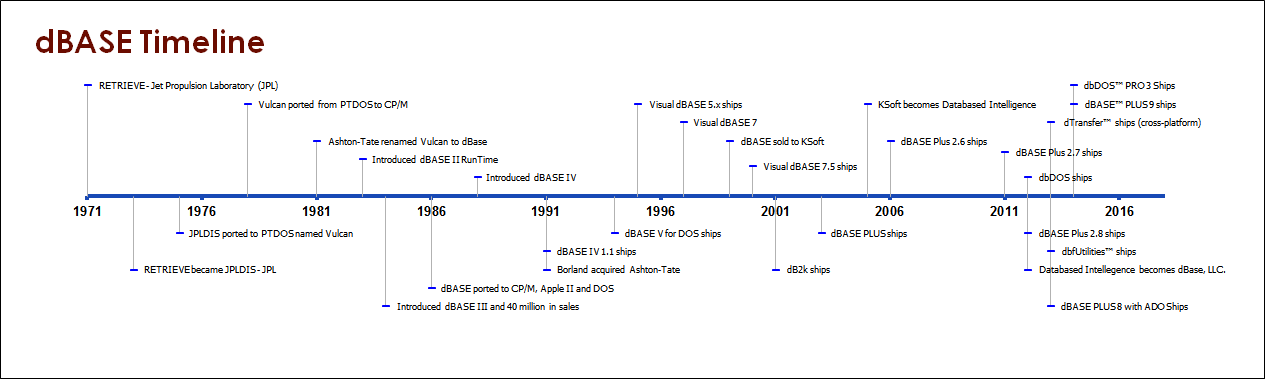
Full timeline for all the dBase Products.

== dBASE product range ==
=== dBase, LLC products ===
- dBASE PLUS: Windows only. Released 2022. Final version 12, released 2019.
- dBASE 2019: Successor of dBASE PLUS 12. Requires Windows Vista or later. Builds 32-bit Windows applications, supports 32-bit and 64-bit Windows.
- dBASE CLASSIC: dBASE V for DOS without DOS emulator, originally found in dBASE PLUS 9. Also includes original documentation included in the installation in PDF format.
- dbDOS: A MS-DOS emulator.

- dbDOS PRO: Successor of dbDOS 1.5.1, starts with version 2.
- dbDOS Open Source: Open source version of dbDOS.
- dbDOSv: Successor of dbDOS PRO 7.
- dbDOSv 2.x: Successor of dbDOSv 1.x.

- dbfUtilities: .dbf file processing utilities.

- dbfCompare: Compares differences between tables.
- dbfExport: Converts .dbf table to other file formats.
- dbfImport: Converts other file formats into .dbf format.
- dbfInspect: Read, modify, insert, delete, pack, and print using any dBASE IV and later tables.

==== SQL Utilities ====
- dumpSQL: Extracts all of the records of an existing table into a new table in the supported file formats.
- moveSQL: Transfers all of the records of an existing table into a new table in the supported database formats.

== dBase / xBase programming language ==
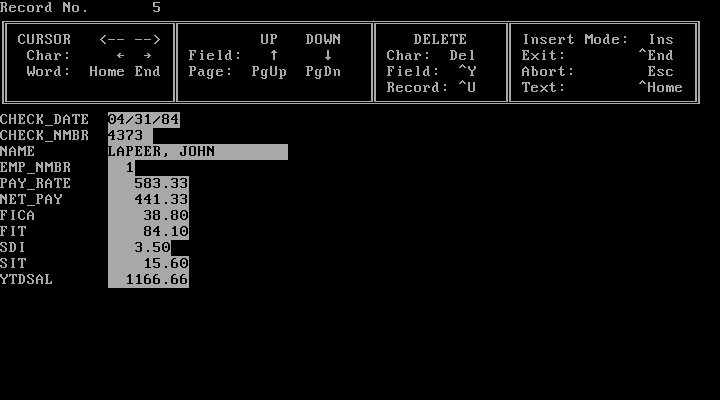
Screenshot of dBase III with screen mask

For handling data, dBase provided detailed procedural commands and functions to

- open and traverse records in data files (e.g., USE, SKIP, GO TOP, GO BOTTOM, and GO recno),
- manipulate field values (REPLACE and STORE), and
- manipulate text strings (e.g., STR() and SUBSTR()), numbers, and dates.

dBase is an application development language and integrated navigational database management system. Like BASIC it offers immediate results to interactive commands which likely contributed to dBASE's early sales success, as customers in computer stores could quickly enter data and ask questions about it. Ashton-Tate labeled dBASE as "relational" but it does not meet the criteria defined by Dr. Edgar F. Codd's relational model. "dBASE used a runtime interpreter architecture, which allowed the user to execute commands by typing them in a command line “dot prompt.” Similarly, program scripts (text files with PRG extensions) ran in the interpreter (with the DO command).

Over time, Ashton-Tate's competitors introduced so-called clone products and compilers that had more robust programming features such as user-defined functions (UDFs), arrays for complex data handling. Ashton-Tate and its competitors also began to incorporate SQL, the ANSI/ISO standard language for creating, modifying, and retrieving data stored in relational database management systems.

Eventually, it became clear that the dBase world had expanded far beyond Ashton-Tate. A "third-party" community formed, consisting of Fox Software, Nantucket, Alpha Software, Data Based Advisor Magazine, SBT and other application development firms, and major developer groups. Paperback Software launched the flexible and fast VP-Info with a unique built-in compiler. The community of dBase variants sought to create a dBase language standard, supported by IEEE committee X3J19 and initiative IEEE 1192. They said "xBase" to distinguish it from the Ashton-Tate product.

Ashton-Tate saw the rise of xBase as an illegal threat to its proprietary technology. In 1988 they filed suit against Fox Software and Santa Cruz Operation (SCO) for copying dBase's "structure and sequence" in FoxBase+ (SCO marketed XENIX and UNIX versions of the Fox products). In December 1990, U.S. District judge Terry Hatter Jr. dismissed Ashton-Tate's lawsuit and invalidated Ashton-Tate's copyrights for not disclosing that dBase had been based, in part, on the public domain JPLDIS. In October 1991, while the case was still under appeal, Borland International acquired Ashton-Tate, and as one of the merger's provisions the U.S. Justice Department required Borland to end the lawsuit against Fox and allow other companies to use the dBase/xBase language without the threat of legal action.

By the end of 1992, major software companies raised the stakes by acquiring the leading xBase products. Borland acquired Ashton-Tate's dBase products (and later WordTech's xBase products), Microsoft acquired Fox Software's FoxBASE+ and FoxPro products, and Computer Associates acquired Nantucket's Clipper products. Advisor Media built on its Data Based Advisor magazine by launching FoxPro Advisor and Clipper Advisor (and other) developer magazines and journals, and live conferences for developers. However, a planned dBase Advisor Magazine was aborted due to the market failure of dBase IV.

By the year 2000, the xBase market had faded as developers shifted to new database systems and programming languages. Computer Associates (later known as CA) eventually dropped Clipper. Borland restructured and sold dBase. Of the major acquirers, Microsoft stuck with xBase the longest, evolving FoxPro into Visual FoxPro, but the product is no longer offered. In 2006 Advisor Media stopped its last-surviving xBase magazine, FoxPro Advisor. The era of xBase dominance has ended, but there are still xBase products. The dBase product line is now owned by dBase LLC which currently sells dBASE PLUS 12.3 and a DOS-based dBASE CLASSIC (dbDOS to run it on 64-bit Windows).

Some open source implementations are available, such as Harbour, xHarbour, and Clip.

In 2015, a new member of the xBase family was born: the XSharp (X#) language, maintained as an open source project with a compiler, its own IDE, and Microsoft Visual Studio integration. XSharp produces .NET assemblies and uses the familiar xBase language. The XSharp product was originally created by a group of four enthusiasts who have worked for the Vulcan.NET project in the past. The compiler is created on top of the Roslyn compiler code, the code behind the C# and VB compilers from Microsoft.

=== Programming examples ===
Today, implementations of the dBase language have expanded to include many features targeted for business applications, including object-oriented programming, manipulation of remote and distributed data via SQL, Internet functionality, and interaction with modern devices.

The following example opens an employee table ("empl"), gives every manager who supervises 1 or more employees a 10-percent raise, and then prints the names and salaries.

 USE empl
 REPLACE ALL salary WITH salary * 1.1 FOR supervisors > 0
 LIST ALL fname, lname, salary TO PRINT
 * (comment: reserved words shown in CAPITALS for illustration purposes)

Note how one does not have to keep mentioning the table name. The assumed ("current") table stays the same until told otherwise. Because of its origins as an interpreted interactive language, dBase used a variety of contextual techniques to reduce the amount of typing needed. This facilitated incremental, interactive development but also made larger-scale modular programming difficult. A tenet of modular programming is that the correct execution of a program module must not be affected by external factors such as the state of memory variables or tables being manipulated in other program modules. Because dBase was not designed with this in mind, developers had to be careful about porting (borrowing) programming code that assumed a certain context and it would make writing larger-scale modular code difficult. Work-area-specific references were still possible using the arrow notation (B->customer) so that multiple tables could be manipulated at the same time. In addition, if the developer had the foresight to name their tables appropriately, they could clearly refer to a large number of tables open at the same time by notation such as (employee->salary) and (vacation->start_date). Alternatively, the alias command could be appended to the initial opening of a table statement which made referencing a table field unambiguous and simple. For example. one can open a table and assign an alias to it in this fashion, "use EMP alias Employee", and henceforth, refer to table variables as Employee->Name.

Another notable feature is the re-use of the same clauses for different commands. For example, the FOR clause limits the scope of a given command. (It is somewhat comparable to SQL's WHERE clause.) Different commands such as LIST, DELETE, REPLACE, BROWSE, etc. could all accept a FOR clause to limit (filter) the scope of their activity. This simplifies the learning of the language.

dBase was also one of the first business-oriented languages to implement string evaluation.

 i = 2
 myMacro = "i + 10"
 i = &myMacro
 * comment: i now has the value 12

Here the & tells the interpreter to evaluate the string stored in "myMacro" as if it were programming code. This is an example of a feature that made dBase programming flexible and dynamic, sometimes called "meta ability" in the profession. This could allow programming expressions to be placed inside tables, somewhat reminiscent of formulas in spreadsheet software.

However, it could also be problematic for pre-compiling and for making programming code secure from hacking. But, dBase tended to be used for custom internal applications for small and medium companies where the lack of protection against copying, as compared to compiled software, was often less of an issue.

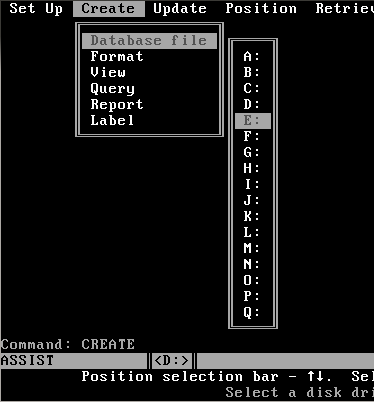
ASSIST application in dBase III+.

== File formats ==
A major legacy of dBase is its .dbf file format, which has a header section that self-documents the data structure, encouraging its use in other software. As a de facto standard it has been adopted in a number of other applications. For example, the shapefile format, developed by ESRI for spatial data in its PC ArcInfo geographic information system, uses .dbf files to store feature attribute data.

Microsoft recommends saving a Microsoft Works database file in the dBase file format so that it can be read by Microsoft Excel.

A package is available for Emacs to read xbase files.

LibreOffice and OpenOffice Calc can read and write all generic dbf files.

dBase's database system was one of the first to provide a header section. This meant that the program does not need advance knowledge of the data structure, but can ask the data file how it was structured. There are several variations on the .dbf file structure, and not all dBase-related products and .dbf file structures are compatible. VP-Info is unique in that it can read all variants of the dbf file structure.

A second filetype is the .dbt file format for memo fields. While character fields are limited to 254 characters each, a memo field is a 10-byte pointer into a .dbt file which can include a much larger text field. dBase was very limited in its ability to process memo fields, but some other xBase languages such as Clipper treated memo fields as strings just like character fields for all purposes except permanent storage.

dBase uses .ndx files for single indexes, and .mdx (multiple-index) files for holding between 1 and 48 indexes. Some xBase languages such as VP-Info include compatibility with .ndx files while others use different file formats such as .ntx used by Clipper and .idx/.cdx used by FoxPro or FlagShip. Later iterations of Clipper included drivers for .ndx, .mdx, .idx and .cdx indexes.

== Reception ==
A 1990 American Institute of Certified Public Accountants member survey found that 16% used dBASE as their database, in second place behind Lotus 1-2-3 (25%) and ahead of R:Base (10%).

BYTE's Jerry Pournelle in July 1980 called Vulcan "infuriatingly excellent" because the software was powerful but the documentation was poor. He praised its speed and sophisticated queries, but said that "we do a lot of pounding at the table and screaming in rage at the documentation".

InfoWorld in 1981 described dBASE II for CP/M as excellent. While criticizing the documentation's lack of example code, the magazine approved of its speed, power, and money-back guarantee, stating that dBASE was far superior to BASIC or Pascal for application development. Another review of dBASE II for CP/M in 1984 said that users' initial positive impression of power and ease of use would fade as they noticed flaws, citing slow speed, incomplete and erroneous language documentation, high price, lack of a compiler, and remaining bugs in versions 2.3 and 2.4. InfoWorld concluded that "At this point in its maturity, dBASE II should be almost bug free and supported by excellent documentation. Unfortunately, it doesn't yet fulfill these expectations".

Sextant in 1983 approved of dBASE II 2.3b for Heath/Zenith CP/M's power and flexibility, stating that a novice could use it to store data and create reports without writing dBASE code, then add functionality as needed. The magazine also cited Ashton-Tate's good customer support, but noted a bug with the built-in editor resulting in random "garbage". Sextant concluded by recommending dBASE "to almost any business that uses a computer running CP/M or MP/M".

"Is [dBASE IV 1.0] worth the wait? I think so", Malcolm Rubel wrote in BYTE in 1989, describing it as "a quantum leap over dBASE III Plus in functionality, power, and ease of use". He said that the software was 100% upward compatible as Ashton-Tate had promised, and praised Control Center as greatly improving on III Plus's Assist mode. The magazine noted early reports of bugs and promised a followup, but concluded that "the product seems solid overall".
