= Clipper (programming language) =

Compiler for xBase

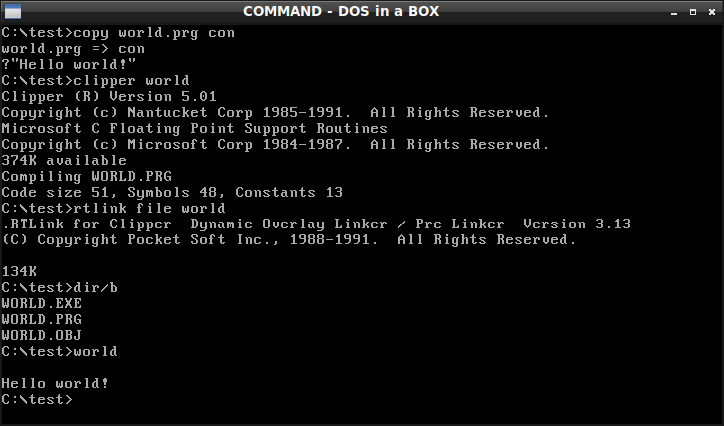
- Compiling and running hello world program
- Family: xBase
- Developers: Nantucket Corporation; Computer Associates
- First appeared: 1985; 41 years ago
- Final release: CA Clipper 5.3b / May 20, 1997; 28 years ago
- OS: DOS
- License: proprietary
- Website: Last known Website www.grafxsoft.com/clipper.htm still exists, but relevant content has been removed, even for the main webpage. Looking back in time at this URL in Wayback Machine, real content appears last available on June 16, 2018. This archived content still available at: web.archive.org/web/20180616231447/http://www.grafxsoft.com/clipper.htm. Trying to place an order at the page bottom will fall.

Influenced by
- dBase

Influenced
- Harbour

Clipper is an xBase compiler that implements a variant of the xBase computer programming language. It is used to create or extend software programs that usually ran on DOS originally. Although it is a powerful general-purpose programming language, it was used mainly to create database business programs.

One major dBase feature not implemented in Clipper is the dot-prompt (. prompt) interactive command set, which was an important part of the original dBase implementation.

Clipper, from Nantucket Corp and later Computer Associates, started out as a native code compiler for dBase III databases, and later evolved.

== History ==
Clipper was created by Nantucket Corporation, a company that was started in 1984 by Barry ReBell (management) and Brian Russell (technical). Larry Heimendinger was Nantucket's president. In 1992, the company was sold to Computer Associates for 190 million dollars and the product was renamed to CA-Clipper.

Clipper was created as a replacement programming language for Ashton Tate's dBASE III, a very popular database language at the time. The advantage of Clipper over dBASE was that it could be compiled and executed on DOS as a standalone application. In the years between 1985 and 1992, millions of Clipper applications were built, typically for small businesses dealing with databases concerning many aspects of client management and inventory management. For many smaller businesses, having a Clipper application designed to their specific needs was their first experience with software development. Also many applications for banking and insurance companies were developed, here especially in those cases where the application was considered too small to be developed and run on traditional mainframes. In these environments Clipper also served as a front end for existing mainframe applications.

As the product matured, it added elements of the programming languages C and Pascal, and object-oriented programming (OOP), and the code-block data-type (hybridizing the concepts of dBase macros, or string-evaluation, and function pointers), to become far more powerful than the original. Nantucket's Aspen project later matured into the Windows native-code CA-Visual Objects compiler.

== Market penetration ==
Nantucket sold well in Western markets. Also, in November 1991, the New York Times reported the company's success in "painstakingly convincing Soviet software developers that buying is preferable to pirating". According to the article, Clipper had sold 2,000 copies in the Soviet Union (compared to 250,000 worldwide).

=== Decline ===
In the early 1990s, under new ownership, Clipper failed to transition from DOS to Windows. As a result, almost no new commercial applications were written in Clipper after 1995.

By then, the "classically trained programmer" commonly used strong typing, in contrast to the original dBASE language. An evolution of Clipper, named Visual Objects, added strong typing but made it optional, to remain compatible with existing code. Four of the more important languages that took over from Clipper were Visual Basic, Microsoft Access, Delphi, and Powerbuilder. All provided strong typing.

=== Revival by third-parties ===
The Clipper language is being actively implemented and extended by multiple organizations/vendors, like XBase++ from Alaska Software and FlagShip, and free (GPL-licensed) projects like Harbour and xHarbour.

Many of the current implementations are portable (DOS, Windows, Linux (32- and 64-bit), Unix (32- and 64-bit), and macOS), supporting many language extensions, with much extended runtime libraries, and various Replaceable Database Drivers (RDD) supporting many popular database formats, like DBF, DBTNTX, DBFCDX (FoxPro, Apollo, Comix, and Advantage Database Server), MachSix (SIx Driver and Apollo), SQL, and more. These newer implementations all strive for full compatibility with the standard dBase/xBase syntax, while also offering OOP approaches and target-based syntax such as SQLExecute().

=== Usenet ===
The Clipper Usenet newsgroups are comp.lang.clipper and comp.lang.clipper.visual-objects.

== Programming ==
A simple hello world - application (fully functional after compiling):

Procedure Main       //Or Proc Main, same result.
    ? "Hello World!"
Return               //Or Retu, same result.

A simple data base input mask (without actual function or procedure start/end):

USE Customer SHARED NEW
clear
@  1, 0 SAY "CustNum" GET Customer->CustNum PICT "999999" VALID Customer->CustNum > 0
@  3, 0 SAY "Contact" GET Customer->Contact VALID !empty(Customer->Contact)
@  4, 0 SAY "Address" GET Customer->Address
READ

== Version history ==
The various Clipper versions, and release dates, were:

From Nantucket Corporation; the "seasonal versions", billed as "dBase compilers":

- Nantucket Clipper Winter'84 – May 25, 1985
- Nantucket Clipper Summer'85 – 1985
- Nantucket Clipper Winter'85 – January 29, 1986
- Nantucket Clipper Autumn'86 – October 31, 1986
- Nantucket Clipper Summer'87 – December 21, 1987

From Nantucket Corporation; Clipper 5:

- Nantucket Clipper 5.00 – 1990
- Nantucket Clipper 5.01 – April 15, 1991
- Nantucket Clipper 5.01 Rev.129 – March 31, 1992

and from Computer Associates; CA-Clipper 5:

- CA Clipper 5.01a –
- CA Clipper 5.20 – February 15, 1993
- CA-Clipper 5.2a – March 15, 1993
- CA Clipper 5.2b – June 25, 1993
- CA-Clipper 5.2c – August 6, 1993
- CA Clipper 5.2d – March 25, 1994
- CA-Clipper 5.2e – February 7, 1995
- CA Clipper 5.30 – June 26, 1995
- CA Clipper 5.3a – May 20, 1996
- CA Clipper 5.3b – May 20, 1997

=== Clipper Tools ===
After buying Nantucket, along with the standard Clipper library, CA developed another, named Clipper Tools. Three versions of this library were released, alongside Clipper versions. This library became a de facto standard among Clipper clones, such as xHarbour. It was also cloned by several of Clipper's clones.
