= Database application =

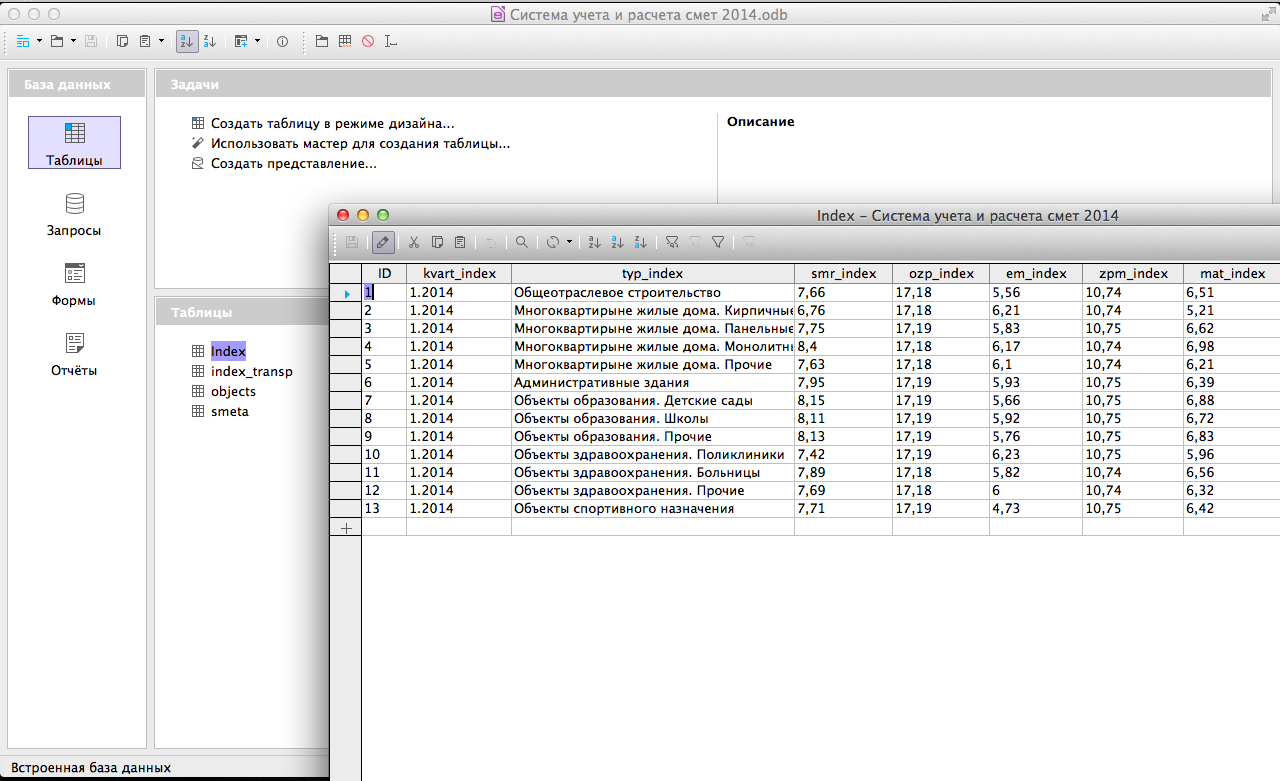
LibreOffice Base is an example of a database application

A database application is a computer program whose primary purpose is retrieving information from a computerized database. From here, information can be inserted, modified or deleted which is subsequently conveyed back into the database. Early examples of database applications were accounting systems and airline reservations systems, such as SABRE, developed starting in 1957.

A characteristic of modern database applications is that they facilitate simultaneous updates and queries from multiple users. Systems in the 1970s might have accomplished this by having each user in front of a 3270 terminal to a mainframe computer. By the mid-1980s it was becoming more common to give each user a personal computer and have a program running on that PC that is connected to a database server. Information would be pulled from the database, transmitted over a network, and then arranged, graphed, or otherwise formatted by the program running on the PC. Starting in the mid-1990s it became more common to build database applications with a Web interface. Rather than develop custom software to run on a user's PC, the user would use the same Web browser program for every application. A database application with a Web interface had the advantage that it could be used on devices of different sizes, with different hardware, and with different operating systems. Examples of early database applications with Web interfaces include amazon.com, which used the Oracle relational database management system, the photo.net online community, whose implementation on top of Oracle was described in the book Database-Backed Web Sites (Ziff-Davis Press; May 1997), and eBay, also running Oracle.

Electronic medical records are referred to on emrexperts.com, in December 2010, as "a software database application". A 2005 O'Reilly book uses the term in its title: Database Applications and the Web.

Some of the most complex database applications remain accounting systems, such as SAP, which may contain thousands of tables in only a single module. Many of today's most widely used computer systems are database applications, for example, Facebook, which was built on top of MySQL.

The etymology of the phrase "database application" comes from the practice of dividing computer software into systems programs, such as the operating system, compilers, the file system, and tools such as the database management system, and application programs, such as a payroll check processor. On a standard PC running Microsoft Windows, for example, the Windows operating system contains all of the systems programs while games, word processors, spreadsheet programs, photo editing programs, etc. would be application programs. As "application" is short for "application program", "database application" is short for "database application program".

Not every program that uses a database would typically be considered a "database application". For example, many physics experiments, e.g., the Large Hadron Collider, generate massive data sets that programs subsequently analyze. The data sets constitute a "database", though they are not typically managed with a standard relational database management system. The computer programs that analyze the data are primarily developed to answer hypotheses, not to put information back into the database and therefore the overall program would not be called a "database application".

== Examples of database applications ==
- Amazon
- Student Data
- CNN
- eBay
- Facebook
- Fandango
- Filemaker (Mac OS)
- LibreOffice Base
- Microsoft Access
- Oracle relational database
- SAP (Systems, Applications & Products in Data Processing)
- Ticketmaster
- Wikipedia
- Yelp
- YouTube
- Google
- MySQL
