= Wayne Ratliff =

American computer scientist

Cecil Wayne Ratliff (born 1946) wrote the database program Vulcan. Raised in Germany and the US, he now resides in the Los Angeles area.

== Biography ==
Ratliff was born in 1946 in Trenton, Ohio, USA. From 1969 to 1982 he worked for the Martin Marietta Corporation in a progression of engineering and managerial positions. He was a member of the NASA Viking program flight team when the Viking spacecraft landed on Mars in 1976, and wrote the data management system, MFILE, for the Viking lander support software.

In 1978 Ratliff wrote Vulcan, a database application, to help him make picks for football pools. Written in Intel 8080 assembly language, it ran on the CP/M operating system and was modeled on JPLDIS. After selling Vulcan by himself from 1979 to 1980, he licensed the software, renamed dBASE, to Ashton-Tate. In 1982 Ratliff left JPL and joined Ashton-Tate as vice president of new technology. (He never used the software for its original purpose; in 1984 Ratliff confessed that dBASE had made him so busy that "I've only had time to watch two or three football games".)

Ratliff was the project manager for dBASE III, as well as designer and lead programmer. From 1987 to 1988 Ratliff wrote Emerald Bay, a client/server database manager. Currently retired, Ratliff spends time sailing and studying mathematics. He has worked on computer systems for use in competitive sailboat racing.

Ratliff's early career and projects are described in the book Programmers at Work, a collection of interviews published by Microsoft Press.
