= List of Classic Mac OS software =

This is a list of Classic Mac OS Macintosh software that no longer run on current Macs. The software might require versions of Classic Mac OS. Most old programs can still be run using emulators, such as SheepShaver, vMac, or Basilisk II.

For a list of macOS programs, see List of Mac software. Third-party databases include VersionTracker, MacUpdate and iUseThis. Since a list like this might grow too big and become unmanageable, this list is confined to programs for which a Wikipedia article exists.

== Children's and educational software ==
- Cosmic Osmo and the Worlds Beyond the Mackerel
- Creative Writer
- Early Learning House
- Fine Artist
- Imagination Express
- Kid Pix
- KidDesk
- Living Books
- Mighty Math
- Strategy Challenges Collection
- Thinkin' Things

== Databases ==
- dbase
- FoxPro
- Omnis
- Panorama

== Developer tools and IDEs ==
- Apple Media Tool
- AppWare
- Aztec C
- CodeWarrior
- HyperCard – Classic-only IDE
- MacApp
- Macintosh Programmer's Workshop
- Microsoft BASIC
- MTropolis
- Oracle Media Objects
- THINK C
- VideoWorks
- World Builder – game creation system

== Graphics, layout, and desktop publishing ==
- CorelDRAW
- CricketDraw
- CricketPaint
- Digital Darkroom
- Freehand
- FullPaint
- FullWrite Professional
- Gryphon Software Morph
- Illustrator
- LightningPaint
- MacDraw
- MacPaint
- MacPerspective
- MacRenderman
- Macromind Director
- PageMaker
- Photoshop
- PixelPaint
- QuarkXPress
- Ready, Set, Go!
- Showplace
- Strata 3D
- SuperPaint
- Typestry

== Mail Client ==
- Eudora

== Networking and telecommunications ==
- 4-Sight Fax
- AppleLink
- eWorld
- FreePPP
- Hotline Connect
- MacTerminal
- ZTerm

== Office and productivity ==
- AppleWorks – originally ClarisWorks
- Claris Resolve
- CricketGraph
- FullWrite Professional
- Informix Wingz
- Lotus 123
- Lotus Jazz
- MacProject
- MacWrite
- Microsoft Project
- Microsoft Works
- MindWrite
- Multiplan
- Noteshare
- OpenDoc
- StatView
- Taste (software)
- WordPerfect for Macintosh
- WriteNow

== Operating systems ==
- A/UX
- Classic Mac OS
  - System 1
  - System 6
  - System 7
  - Mac OS 8
  - Mac OS 9
- MkLinux

== Outliners ==
- Acta (software)
- MORE (application)

== Screen savers ==
- After Dark

== Utilities ==
- Disinfectant – Antivirus
- DragThing
- Extensis Suitcase
- Fastback
- MultiFinder
- PC Exchange

=== Compression ===
- Compact Pro
- DiskDoubler
- PackIt
- Stuffit

== Web browsers ==
- Cyberdog
- Internet Explorer
- MacLynx
- MacWeb
- MacWWW
- NCSA Mosaic
- Netscape Communicator
- Netscape Navigator

== See also ==
- List of Mac software
