= Verbum (magazine) =

Former personal computer and computer graphics magazine

- Cover of Verbum 2.3, Fall '88.
- Editor: Michael Gosney
- Categories: Computer magazines
- Frequency: Quarterly
- Format: Paper magazine
- Circulation: National
- Publisher: Verbum, Inc.
- Founder: Michael Gosney
- Founded: 1986
- First issue: 1.0, Summer/Fall '86
- Final issue Number: 5.2, Fall/Winter '91; 16
- Country: USA
- Language: English
- ISSN: 0889-4507

Verbum was an early personal computer and computer art magazine focusing on interactive art and computer graphics. It was edited and published from 1986 until 1991 by Michael Gosney. It, along with Info 64, was one of the first periodicals to be entirely based on desktop publishing techniques. Referring to itself as a "journal of personal computer aesthetics," Verbum was notable for placing more emphasis on creative aspects of its subject matter in contrast to the overwhelmingly technical content of other publications.

== Overview ==
It was laid out in Aldus PageMaker 1.2 on Macintosh Plus computers and generated camera-ready 300 dpi printout from an Apple LaserWriter Plus. It grew from early black and white content to include color and make use of the growing fields of image manipulation and multimedia. In 1989, Verbum held the first Digital Be-In, which sought to meld the ideals of the 1960s counterculture with the emerging cyberculture of the early 1990s.

== Issues ==
This list of issues and their content is based on information printed in Verbum issues 5.1 and 5.2.

Issue	Date	Notes
1.0	Summer/Fall '86	1000-copy edition, inaugural issue. Cover illustration by Michael Gosney with FullPaint and ThunderScan, with type and format designed by John Odam with PageMaker. Minimal writing and no advertising. Retrospective of publisher Gosney's "Macintosh Verbum" one-man show, and Macintosh art by French illustrator Jean Sole, Australian Malcolm Thain, nature artist Jim Pollock, Jim Hance, Jack Davis, Ed Roxburgh and Nathan Weedmark, plus excerpts from Michael Green's Zen & The Art of the Macintosh.
1.1	Winter/Spring '87	The first "real" Verbum, designed with PageMaker 1.2, black-and-white, 300 dpi laser output, beautifully printed on 70 lb. Sequoia Matte, 5000-copy edition. Cover: masthead type treatment by Jack Davis with MacDraw and illustration, also by Jack, with Pro3D (Linotronic output). Avant-garde concept artist Paul Rutkovsky's redigitized illustrations. Mike Swartzbeck's trailblazing scanned image montage. David Brunn's digital photography. John Odam on Fontographer.
1.2	Summer '87	Produced with Ready, Set, Go! 3.0, 1270 dpi Lino imagesetter output. Cover illustration by Jack Davis using Realist (pre-release of ImageStudio). "Amiga Video" on the animated Amiga. "Painting as Spiritual Discipline" by Jack Davis on MacCalligraphy. "Big Blue Art" by Mike Kelly on DOS- based graphics, "Lino Seps" by Mike Saenz features the first publication of his Marvel Comics' Iron Man cover, the first PostScript separation. Australian Mac-artist Malcolm Thain.
1.3	Fall '87	Produced with PageMaker 2.0.10,000-copy run, the first to be sold on newsstands. Cover: masthead type by Ed Roxburgh and photo/illustration by Jack Davis, both developed with ImageStudio. April Greiman's "Pacific Wave" sculpture/exhibit. "Desktop Videos." "Continuum," a short story by Linnea Dayton. Dominique de Bardonneche-Berglund, Swiss digital painter. Jack Davis on ImageStudio. "Creative Waveforms" by Neal Fox focuses on music.
2.1	Winter/Spring '88	The first color cover produced with Illustrator 88, by John Odam, digitally separated. Steve Hannaford's first "Against the Grain" column with critical technical/economic guidance. "Stackware Party" by Linnea Dayton. Lawrence Kaplan's "Hot-Tech" prints. "The Fine Art of Dot-Matrix Printing" by Nira. "PC 3D Showcase" by Jack Davis. "Color Output Options" by Erfert Nielson. John Odam's "First Contact" on FreeHand.
2.2	Summer '88	Verbum's first cover theme is "Fashion." Cover by Jack Davis, Lisa King and Michael Gosney combined scanned images with Adobe Illustrator elements (this cover won a magazine industry award). "PC Fashion Design." Mel Ristau's "Electroglyphs"—iconic PostScript illustrations. Georganne Deen's "Rock and Rolling Amiga." "Sound Sampling Sensation" by Neal Fox. A how-to on shooting slides off your high-resolution monitor.
2.3	Fall '88	"Space" concept issue cover by Tom Gould utilizing Aldus FreeHand 1.0. "Outer Space" gallery of cosmic visions by Ron Cobb and William Lombardo. Architectural CADD survey with "Living Space" gallery. "Art Space" gallery features works by Bert Monroy, Ikeda Tomoyo and Dominique de Bardonneche-Berglund, digitally separated with PixelPaint 2.0. Nicholas MacConnell and Linnea Dayton travel to "Inner Space" with "Through the Silicon Looking Glass," an exploration of PCs as mind machines. John Odam on PixelPaint.
3.1	Winter '88	"The Word" issue cover illustration by Tom Lewis and company with FreeHand. Jack Davis' "Initial FX" on special-effect initial caps. Mike Kelly's "Grammar and Style Checkers." A parody on "Third-Generation Software for Writers" by Michael Rossman. The first Verbum Interview with the intelligent program Racter. Gallery of image-laden poetry and poetic images. John Odam takes a second look at Fontographer and font design.
3.2	Spring '89	"4D" issue cover by Jack Davis with Pro3D and PhotoFinish. "The Democratization of Computer Graphics" by Peter Sorensen. "Down to the Desktop" by Gregory MacNicol. "MIDl-Laser Performance Art—Cosmic Jam" by Nicholas MacConnell. "The Telemorphic Future" by Tad Williams. "Hyper-Animation, "by Elon Gasper. "Interactive Artistry" with pioneering HyperCard projects. The Verbum Interview with Todd Rundgren. "HyperGallery" features HyperCard art and the "4D Gallery" showcases animated visions. Produced with PageMaker 3.01 and includes many digital color separations.
3.3	Summer '89	"Lifestyle" theme issue with cover designed by David Smith using Adobe Illustrator 88. Brenda Laurel's essay, "On Dramatic Interaction," is a definitive study of virtual reality and the dramatic arts. An update on "Computer-Aided Fashion Design." Russel Sipe covers hot computer games. Mark Stephen Pierce writes about designing games in "Making Fun." Columns cover telecom and health issues for PC users. The Gallery emphasizes human forms.
3.4	Fall '89	"Metaprint" issue focuses on output, with a Gallery that explores printing options. Cover by John Odam using FreeHand 2.0. "Separation Anxiety" by Steve Hannaford. "Pixels at an Exhibition" by Brian Alexander studies the techniques for putting PC art on the wall. "Imagine Tokyo '89" recounts the latest major Verbum-produced exhibit with four pages of art and photos (all separated with the Scitex/Visionary system). "Architectural CAD on the Macintosh" by Phil Inje Chang. The first instalment of David Traub's "Neomedia" describes the educational advantages of videodisc barcode readers. "First Contact" explores PhotoMac color separation/editing software.
4.1	Spring '90	"The Word" revisited is the first perfect-bound issue. Steve Roth's "W(h)ither PostScript?" provides a definitive report on the essential page description language. "The Interlocution Solution" by Christopher Yavelow and "OCR" by Mike Kelly bring us to the cutting edge of voice recognition and optical character recognition, respectively. George Seibt's "Oh George! Where Has All the Film Gone?" gives a thorough overview of still video technology. The "Type Gallery" features creative font forms. In honor of the 20th anniversary of Earth Day, a colorful "Earth Gallery." "Neomedia" begins a glossary of new media terminology. "Against the Grain" covers the industry changes in digital font standards. John Odam's "First Contact" takes us through 3D rendering of type.
4.2	Summer/Fall '90	The "Blendo Issue" focuses on movement, synergy, and the convergence of creative cultures through computers. The "60's/90's Trip" by Michael Gosney looks at the melding of sub cultures at Verbum's annual San Francisco Digital Art Be-In. "MultiMIDIa Performance Art" by Marc Weidenbaum examines several artists' fusion of sound and vision through digital creativity. Galleries focus on Blendo—image montage and animation—and interactivity, with a selection of noteworthy multimedia design projects. The debut of "Secrets of the Universe Revealed," the Verbum How-To column, features Bert Monroy making multimedia. John Odam makes type with FontStudio. David Traub offers his "Neomedia Glossary" and industry observations. Steve Hannaford plays devil's advocate with "MuddyMedia Revisited. "The lead feature story sizes up the NeXT Cube.
4.3	Winter/Spring '91	"Digital Art Lifestyle" explores the "set and setting" of those working with PCs. Michael Gosney's Intro covers "Creative Computers/ Creative People" and "Virtual (What Is) Reality?" Steve Hannaford explores "Home Office Politics." The Verbum How-To features Jack Davis' type effects with Photoshop. John Odam makes his "First Contact" with SuperCard and MacroMind Director, converting a book to hypermedia format. Dave Traub's "Neomedia" takes readers on a hyper-tour of key multimedia conferences. The Verbum Interview with rock legend Graham Nash and partner Rand Wetherwax reveals Nash's enthusiastic involvement with digital photo output and multimedia. "The Smart Studio" profiles electronic design, MIDI, and multimedia studios. Gene Brawn's "Confessions of an Amiga User" details the new world of Amiga, including the Video Toaster and CDTV. The Gallery concentrates on human forms.
5.1	Spring '91	"Input/Output" issue focuses on scanning and printing, with a secondary emphasis on desktop video, or "PC-TV." Publisher Gosney's Relay column gives an overview of multimedia optical publishing technology, and a poetic piece, "We Create Our Mythos Creates Us." Verbum News updates on the 3rd Annual Digital Art Be-In. Odam's First Contact, "Pass It Along" shows an art file progressively modified by several digital artists. The Verbum How-To steps through the production of the Verbum Roundtable interactive panel discussion. Dayton's Look and Feel offers "Writing and Designing for Multimedia" In Neomedia, David Traub sums up hardware on the Mac for "PC- TV." John Donovan's "Building Bridges—The Amiga-Mac Connection" provides cross-platform solutions. "Fine Art Output" by Arlen Britton offers technical details on archival reproduction of digital art. The Gallery is extensive, with an emphasis on scanned imagery and creative output solutions.
5.2	Fall/Winter '91	"Virtual Reality" issue. Michael Gosney covers Multimedia Books and VR in Hollywood. Brenda Laurel writes about VR once again with "Art and Activism in VR", complemented by a review of the past, present and possible future of VR by Linda Jacobson, "Everyone's Hot to Cybertrot". The Verbum Interviews with John Barlow, Timothy Leary and Myron Krueger. Dave Traub's "Neomedia" considers VR in education: "To Live and Learn in 3D". Michel Kripalani, John Donovan and Gregory MacNicol show-and-tell on the latest innovations in digital 3D tools, "3D on Your Desktop". "Designing Hypermedia (for fun and profit)" looks at Steven Rappaport's The Book of MIDI. The Gallery contains pieces on both Virtual Reality and Multimedia Design, including a review of a CD-ROM by Pixar. John Odham makes "First Contact" with Wacom's pressure sensitive tablet and the new paint programs that can use it. Mike Swartzbeck returns with "If 6 Wuz 9", a hippie-hacker comic. A new column "The Artist's Voice", interviews Barbara Nessim.

== Verbum Interactive ==
In 1991 the magazine began publishing Verbum Interactive, which was billed as the "first CD-ROM periodical." Verbum Interactive was programmed using MacroMind Director by Michel Kripalani and contained innovative multimedia technologies including digital articles with video, hyperlinks, digital audio files and CD-Audio. It was hailed as a groundbreaking product, but criticized for the high cost of the equipment needed to view it, and for the slow performance of the CD-ROM technology it relied upon. Others commented that "the scope of VI, in terms of both its thematic and intellectual expanse and the level of technological expertise with which the final product was produced, is truly remarkable".
