= Cricket Paint =

Raster graphics editors

- Developer: Computer Associates
- Operating system: Macintosh System 6, Windows
- Type: Bitmap-based image editing
- License: Commercial

Cricket Paint was a second generation 1-bit (black and white) painting software program for the Apple Macintosh by Cricket Software. It followed MacPaint and was a competitor to Silicon Beach Software's SuperPaint. Like SuperPaint it was an early attempt to combine the separate graphic methods of bitmap and vector graphics.
Cricket Software already had a vector-only package called CricketDraw. The way it achieved this dualism was with a feature called WetPaint. This allowed the user to draw vector graphics and modify them in an object-oriented way like in Apple's MacDraw, for example, changing the size, stroke and fill. When satisfied, the user could click outside the object and Cricket Paint would convert the vector graphic into a bitmap and place it on the canvas, in a destructive edit. This package had some extra tools not found in MacPaint or MacDraw, such as the Spiral and Starburst, which drew radial lines.

It was also released for Microsoft Windows.

== See also ==
- MacPaint
- SuperPaint (Macintosh)
- CricketDraw
- List of old Macintosh software
