= FullPaint =

- FullPaint on Mac System 6.
- Developer: Ann Arbor Softworks
- Operating system: System 2- System 6 possibly System 7
- Type: Bitmap-based image editing
- License: Proprietary

FullPaint was a software program for the Apple Macintosh for graphics creation. It was developed by Ann Arbor Softworks and was sold as a more powerful alternative to Apple's MacPaint. One of the notable features that differentiated it from MacPaint was its resizable window, and with it the ability to scroll within the document using scroll bars rather than by dragging with the Hand Tool.

The rest of the interface was closely modeled on MacPaint's, with a palette of familiar tools such as the Pencil, Paintbrush, and Paint Bucket, which have survived today in Adobe Systems Photoshop. FullPaint also introduced the screen modes (windowed, full screen with menubar, and full screen without menubar) and the iconic selectors for them which were later used in Photoshop.

Like MacPaint, this was a black-and-white graphics application as the hardware available did not support true grayscale. Grays were simulated using a technique called dithering.

== See also ==
- MacPaint
- FullWrite Professional
- SuperPaint (Macintosh)
- CricketPaint
- List of old Macintosh software
