= Trapeze (spreadsheet program) =

Spreadsheet program for Macintosh computers

- Original authors: Data Tailor, Access Technologies, DeltaPoint
- Developers: Andrew Wulf, Bob Murphy, Ken Clark
- Operating system: classic Mac OS
- Type: Spreadsheet
- License: Proprietary

Trapeze is a discontinued spreadsheet program for Macintosh systems running classic Mac OS. It introduced the concept of using named ranges for most operations instead of cell addresses, allowing formulas to be freed of the location of the data on the page. This, in turn, made updating the sheets by moving data around a safe operation, whereas in contemporary programs like Microsoft Excel and Lotus 1-2-3 this often led to broken formulas. The system did not rely on the sheet as the basis for storage, and allowed multiple tables, charts, graphics and text, which they referred to as "blocks", to be positioned freely.

Introduced in January 1987 at MacWorld San Francisco, sales were not strong and the company formed to introduce the product was insolvent by the fall. The company was purchased by a minicomputer software vendor as part of an effort to break into the microcomputer market, but they decided to exit the business and sold it off again to a new company, DeltaPoint, in 1989. When DeltaPoint's DeltaGraph became a huge hit later that year, sales of Trapeze were ended.

This basic concept of using separate blocks of data and their names to create formulas was the major feature of Lotus Improv, introduced in 1990. This concept is also seen in the modern Apple Numbers.

== History ==
=== Conception ===
In 1984, after seeing the Macintosh computer, Andrew Wulf quit his job at a defence contractor and started a small consulting firm to work on microcomputers. Their first products were a series of Multiplan spreadsheets for the oil and gas market, but these did not sell well. While working on them, Wulf was constantly irritated by the way minor changes to the spreadsheet layout would cause the formulas to stop working. While considering this, Wulf hit upon the idea of "blocks", which would isolate inputs into separate named sections and the formulas could be applied to the names, not the cell references. This meant that the blocks could move and the formulas would still work.

=== Development ===
Wulf's office was a shared space, and one of the other groups included someone who was familiar with startups. He offered to arrange funding for the development of the new product, in exchange for shares in a new company to write it. This resulted in the creation of Data Tailor. With the funding secured in the summer of 1985, Wulf hired two friends, Bob Murphy and Ken Clark, one from college and one from his previous job, to help him write the system. They decided to write the system in the C programming language, although Pascal was far more common on the Mac at that time. The C system, which they complained featured the "world's slowest linker", was run on a Macintosh XL and tested on a Mac 128.

The program was running in partial form in time for the August 1986 meeting of Mac developers at the Fairmont Hotel in San Francisco; at the time these were known as the AppleWorld Conference, becoming the Worldwide Developers Conference (WWDC) in 1990. They then went to MacWorld Boston the same month, where they saw many new products with GUIs that were far better than what they had created. Wulf decided to write an entirely new GUI on top of the still-evolving engine that Murphy and Clark were working on, aiming to have the resulting system ready for MacWorld San Francisco in January 1987. It was during this time that the name was chosen when one of the people in the office asked if they had heard of the band Trapeze.

=== Release ===
Prior to the show, they placed a teaser advertisement in Macworld, which led people to believe the ad was from Ashton-Tate. The first working version was ready only hours before it was time to leave for San Francisco. The product drew considerable attention, not only for its internal capabilities, but also for its use of hierarchical menus, which were a relatively recent invention and not yet supported within the operating system. Trapeze was released into an already crowded spreadsheet market. It nevertheless garnered praise for its unconventional layout and the wide selection of powerful modelling capabilities. It also directly supported the Motorola 68881 floating point unit, which gave it much higher performance than the competition, at least on machines that included this processor.

Reviews were generally positive, with the exception of one in MacUser magazine, which was negative. Wulf blames this negative review for slowing sales, and states that when they met the author a year later he suggested he had been in a bad mood when he wrote it and gave it a poor review as a result. However, an earlier review in Macworld was generally very positive, and one a few months later in InfoWorld was positively effusive. By the summer it was clear the company would soon run out of cash without new sales. By this time the programmer's combined stake in the company was only 5%, as the investors had constantly diluted their shares while adding capital to continue development. The shareholders then suggested they work for free until sales picked up, but the programmers decided to quit instead.

Wulf and Clark then formed The SU5 Group, and after the original investors realized they could not continue development without them, they continued working on the product. Several updates were released through the summer and fall of 1987. Version 1.1, announced in August, added the ability to import Lotus 1-2-3. WKS files, foreign currency symbols, new types of charts and spreadsheet passwords. It also greatly improved the undo functionality, one of the few complaints found in the 1.0 version. Version 2.0, announced in October, further improved undo, added multiple rulers, headers and footers for text layout, and splitters in the displays. It also added additional file formats for both import and export, additional chart features and more graphical options like line sizes and colors.

=== Sale ===
In late 1987, Massachusetts-based Access Technologies purchased Trapeze from Data Tailor and the MindWrite word processor from MindWork Software. Access Technologies previously had only one major product, the 20/20 spreadsheet, a clone of 1-2-3 running on various minicomputers. Seeing the microcomputer encroaching into the mini space, they started to build a portfolio of Mac software. Within a year, the company instead decided to exit business entirely and sell their core 20/20 product to another vendor. This was eventually picked up by Computer Associates in 1991.

To aid the prospective sale, Access spun out the Mac software to several of the company's managers who formed DeltaPoint. Initially continuing sales of MindWrite and Trapeze, they used the income from these products to fund the development of a new charting program. Wulf, by this time, had also written a charting module for the Persuasion presentation program, which received excellent reviews and led to it being purchased by Aldus. DeltaPoint hired Wulf to write the new program, which was released as DeltaGraph. DeltaGraph became a best-seller and sales of MindWrite and Trapeze were ended around 1989 to focus on the new program.

== Description ==
When the program is started, a document is opened that is empty. To begin using it, one or more "blocks" must be added to the worksheet. Blocks can be placed on the worksheet by selecting a type from the Block menu or the on-sheet cursor pop-up; each block type has its own custom cursor, a blank block for placing spreadsheet blocks, a filing cabinet for databases, folded-paper for text blocks, and lined block for graphics. The other cursors include the standard arrow cursor for selecting items, and cursors for moving or resizing blocks. Some of these could be selected from the keyboard to avoid a trip to the menu, for instance, one can move a block by holding down the Option key while in select mode. Blocks also have a name and a comments area, which can be edited via the Block menu, which also offers the ability to change its size, lock it, or make it invisible. Blocks will also automatically resize as data is added.

Formulas in Trapeze are based on the block names. If one has a spreadsheet with two column blocks with Sales and Revenue, one can produce a Profit block by adding a new empty block, naming it Profit, and then typing in the formula Sales - Revenue. When this formula is entered, the Profit block will automatically resize to correctly hold the output of the formula. This can also be performed interactively with the mouse through a series of pop-up menus in the editing area that allow you to select blocks by name and the functions that are appropriate to that type. Blocks of differing dimensions are handled appropriately, for instance, multiplying a two-dimensional block by a single number will produce a new block with all of the individual values multiplied by the scalar, whereas doing the same with two two-dimensional block will cause the output to contain the individual cells multiplied.

Blocks could be placed anywhere in the worksheet, snapping to a grid. Graphics could be placed in other blocks, or on their own. For instance, one could place a line graphic in a spreadsheet block to underline a key value, or import a graphic into its own block and place it behind the sheet. This allowed one to import forms as a graphic and place blocks on top of it to produce interactive forms.

A single workbook could hold up to 32,000 blocks, although for memory reasons it could only have 11 pages which limited the number of blocks to much smaller values. Any one spreadsheet block could have up to 32,000 by 32,000 cells. Early versions did not support Undo very widely, which was a common complaint, but this was improved in later versions. It also never added a macro feature, another common issue.

The system is very similar to the modern Numbers running on macOS. The major difference is that Numbers does not use the term "blocks", and instead talks about the individual items like "spreadsheet" and "chart". Numbers also attempts to automatically extract names from the data itself, including header rows types into the sheets. This means that a sheet with three columns, Sales, Revenue and Profit, will allow formulas to be built as "Profit = Sales - Revenue", which will populate the Profit column without needing a separate block, nor do the names have to be set separately. It also opens with a spreadsheet block already visible, addressing the concern that opening Trapeze to an empty page was confusing for new users.

== Reception ==
After mentioning it in passing in their November 1986 edition, Macworld published an extensive review of the product in their May 1987 edition. It starts by noting that "If you didn't know there were any gaps left to fill in Excel, you will after you try Trapeze." They point out its ability to mix data, results, graphs and text as separate blocks in a single display, whereas at the time, Microsoft Excel required these to be on separate windows. They also note the program's inclusion of powerful formulas, like matrix manipulation, provided functionality that would require macros in Excel. Moreover, these elements were linked together and updated each other, meaning changes to the data would, for instance, immediately update a chart in the same window. They note that setting up a spreadsheet in Trapeze is more difficult because planning is needed to name the various sections, but once set up, "it is much easier to work with Trapeze than Excel, and it is useful to have all the information about a project in one file." They conclude "Although macros are needed to improve performance and the Undo feature has not been adequately implemented in version 1.0, we highly recommend Trapeze to anyone who needs to integrate text and graphics into spreadsheet output."

Another major review appeared in the July 1987 edition of MacUser. The reviewer lauded the interface and the general concept of the system. He was especially impressed with the way formulas were constructed, by linking the names of blocks, and the way the results appeared in a new block that automatically sized itself to the result set, something he calls "magic". He also notes that its ability to import graphics blocks means that, for example, one could create an invoice in MacPaint, import it as a background, and then lay out input and output (formula) blocks on top of the graphic to produce a graphical form. But he also continually pointed out how different it was from other spreadsheet programs, noting "If you are a heavy spreadsheet users, Trapeze takes a lot of getting used to, and just plain doesn't do some things that other spreadsheets do." Additionally, some of the functionality was either difficult to use or simply missing, notably the ability to import data from other spreadsheet programs which meant the only way to transport data was by copy and paste. The review concludes "Depending on what you need to accomplish, Trapeze could be exactly what you've been looking for, or it could be completely inappropriate." The capsule awards it 2.5 mice, of five, and calls it "An unwieldly spreadsheet that can produce beautiful output."

InfoWorld published a two-page review of 2.0 in September 1987, which was extremely positive. Starting off by calling it "revolutionary", they laud the capability to combine calculations graphics and text, and that together they produce results that look like manually laid up desktop publishing output, but one that updates automatically as the numbers change. Having used an earlier version of the program and found the performance "reasonably fast", they note that the new version is much faster than Excel on machines using a FPU, and even on those lacking one, like the standard Mac SE, calculation times were the same as Excel but the load and save times were still much faster. They conclude that "Although it may be surpassed by Excel on some levels as a spreadsheet, or by Page Maker in page layout, Trapeze has some features that neither possesses. As a result, at $295 it represents a significant value for many Macintosh users" and award it a score of 8.3 out of 10.

Macworld covered the program again in February 1988 as part of a spreadsheet roundup, which also included Excel, Lotus Jazz, MacCalc, and Microsoft Works. Trapeze easily beat all of the other programs in almost every feature, allowing much larger worksheets, no limit on the length of text strings (most others were limited to 256 characters or less) and generally more functions and features. The review starts by saying Trapeze is "completely different" and so versatile it could be used as a page-layout program or for graphics editor without ever using the spreadsheet part. They say it is slightly confusing for new users as the document opens with nothing in it and it's up to the user to add items to get it going, but they feel power users will "revel" in its possibilities. Its support for the 68881 made it much faster than any of the other programs, and they suggest it is the best choice for complex sheets. Their only concern was the lack of import/export, limited only to WKS and even then only to the data itself, not the formulas.
