= CricketDraw =

CricketDraw, introduced in 1987, was a second-generation vector graphics creation software program for the Apple Macintosh by Cricket Software. It followed MacDraw and was a contemporary of MacDraft and to some extent, Silicon Beach Software's SuperPaint.

CricketDraw was the first consumer-oriented drawing program to allow the manipulation of Bézier curves. (The existing font design program Fontographer used Bézier curves as well for professional font design and creation.) Another notable feature was CricketDraw's ability to display the raw PostScript code and the QuickDraw-interpreted elements simultaneously in two windows, much as Adobe Systems's Dreamweaver does with HTML code. Furthermore, because it was PostScript-savvy, this package offered fine control over graduated fills that were not supported by MacDraw's QuickDraw-based rendering engine.

== See also ==
- SuperPaint (Macintosh)
- MacDraw
- List of old Macintosh software
