= MindWrite =

Word processor for Macintosh computers

- Original authors: Cary Wyman, Linda Moncrief, Frank Raab, Susan Raab
- Developer: MindWork Software
- Release: 1986
- Final release: 2.17 / 1988
- Operating system: Classic Mac OS
- Type: Outliner/Word Processor
- License: Proprietary

MindWrite is word processor software for early Macintosh computers running classic Mac OS. It was released in 1986 by MindWork Software, making it among the earliest 3rd party word processors on the platform. It was later distributed by Access Technologies, who then transferred their Mac software to a spinoff, DeltaPoint. Sales continued with DeltaPoint at least into the early 1990s.

The key feature of MindWrite was its integrated outliner, a system that allowed documents to be organized in a hierarchy and then re-arranged with drag-and-drop operations. After the release of the pioneering ThinkTank, such systems were considered to be a new way to organize knowledge and perform workflows. MindWrite was the first program to cleanly integrate an outliner with a word processor, and this generated considerable press for the product. The system was otherwise fairly simple in terms of style and layout options and initially lacked a spell checker, issues that were always noted in reviews. Additionally, it was very slow.

An outliner was added to Microsoft Word version 3. When Microsoft began offering software bundles for the Mac, sales of alternative solutions slowed. The product changed hands several times before going dormant in the 1990s. It cannot be used on Macintosh systems higher than 7.0.

== History ==
Cary Wyman and Dennis Moncrief formed AthenaSoft to produce Icon Review, an early mail order catalog of software for the recently released Macintosh. The ultimate goal was to build up a client base which they would then use as the basis for marketing their own software. The program was first advertised as MultiWrite in Icon Review's Summer catalog, which arrived in June. However, the program was not ready at this point, and did not ship until 20 November 1986, which led to "a huge number of complaints."

This arrangement with AthenaSoft worked for a time, but as work on MindWrite continued it proved too difficult to manage and Wyman split off MindWork Software in 1987. Looking for a distributor, in late 1987 MindWork was purchased by Access Technologies, a minicomputer software vendor whose primary product was a spreadsheet program known as 20/20. Access felt that it needed to shift into the microcomputer market as the power of these platforms grew. This led Access to purchase both MindWork and Data Taylor, creators of the Mac spreadsheet Trapeze.

Not long after, Access decided to wind up operations entirely and began looking for potential purchasers. They spun out their Mac products under the DeltaPoint name in order to simplify the offering. The remaining minicomputer portion was purchased by Computer Associates. DeltaPoint continued on its own, using sales of MindWrite and Trapeze to fund the development of a new program, DeltaGraph. DeltaGraph would go on to be a best-seller and continues to be offered as of 2022 through a new developer. Wyman later developed a new word processor for the Mac, Taste, which DeltaPoint distributed in the early 1990s.

== Description ==
MindWrite will appear familiar to any user of early classic MacOS software, especially MacWrite. It does, however, offer many more features. For one, in contrast to MacWrite which allowed only one document to be opened at once, MindWrite allowed four to be opened in separate windows and text could be easily cut and pasted between them. It supported much larger documents, which would have to be broken up into parts in MacWrite. It allowed a new layout ruler to be inserted at any point, easing layout changes. It also allowed editing with both the mouse and cursor keys, although it did not allow text selection using the keyboard, only movement. Some of the more advanced features included a word count, and the ability to mark sections as being changed.

The most notable feature, however, is the outliner system. The document could be marked up with section separators, which defined the levels. A user-selected marker, normally a diamond, appears beside paragraphs. Additional text is normally added at the same level but can be dragged to become a sub-level using the mouse. Sections can be collapsed or expanded by clicking on their marker and can be displayed as empty or with the first line of text when in the collapsed state. When the user moves the mouse over one of the section markers, the pointer turns into a hand, and holding down the mouse button shows it being "pinched" and thus indicating it can be moved. The outline is used as the basis for both the table of contents (TOC) and an optional paragraph numbering feature; one oddity is that the table of contents matches the style of the text in that section header, making the formatting of the TOC difficult.

MindWrite could read files from MacWrite and ThinkTank, as well as plain ASCII text. It could write MacWrite and ASCII. MindWrite 2.0 added Microsoft Word to this list, and featured built-in integration with the Spellswell spell checker. The separate MindWriteExpress application, released at the same time, added over twenty additional formats, allowing it to exchange files with various PC programs as well as minicomputers and even dedicated word processor computers like the Wang series.

== Reception ==
In a "First Look" column published shortly after its initial release, InfoWorld's Michael Miller praises the concept of the program, saying he was a "great fan of the outlining concept" while finding that "the world processing and outlining don't combine as smoothly as they should in most products." He details the outlining capabilities and praises its clean integration in the program, but complains about the performance, noting "you can type ahead f it, though the program will eventually catch up." The company was already promising a future upgrade that would address these problems, which he concludes would mean the $125 price would make it "one of the best buys in the Mac software arena." (Note: InfoWorld always failed to capitalize the "W", printing the name Mindwrite" in every case.)

A more thorough look at the program led to a lengthy three-page review by Charles Rubin. It opens by praising the overall program by noting "the program's outlining is both powerful and flexible, and it is smoothly integrated with Mindwrite's word processing features". However, it immediately notes that it does not include a spell checker and some formatting capabilities seen in Microsoft Word, and that "Our tests showed Mindwrite to be considerably slower than competing programs at many functions." He concludes that the program is merely "satisfactory" in spite of its ease of use and powerful integration.

MacUser made the program its cover story in August 1987. The reviewer, Henry Bortman, starts out by stating "MindWrite is a serious, heavy-duty word processor. Powerful integrating outlining and true writer's features add up to a superior program." After noting some of the missing features, like a spell checker and automatic hyphenation, Bortman suggests that the outliner "does something better than all of that." It also noted that it was rushed to release with many bugs remaining and the speed, "it's not super-slow, but scrolling could definitely stand some speeding up." It concludes with a four-out-of-five rating, with five stars for documentation, support and value, and three for UI, on-screen help and performance.

One of the few negative reviews of the program appeared in the Washington Apple Pi newsletter's April 1987 edition. The reviewer, Fred Seelig, stated "You should not buy it... It is unreliable. It does not do what it promises. And its commands and operating structure will drive you nuts." Although it describes a number of advanced features lacking in other word processors on the platform, including multiple paragraph rulers, cursor key control and table of contents, and states that it "has a lot of nice features that leaves MacWrite in the dust." But also points out a number of bugs, including some crashes. It concludes, "... so far my candidate for Worst Word Processor of the Decade is surely MindWrite."

In a survey of five Macintosh word processors, Compute!'s Apple Applications in 1987 wrote that MindWrite's "word processor is a pleasure in itself", and stated that the "excellent outline processor fuses directly with" it. The magazine criticized its slow speed, however, and suggested that customers might want to wait until bugs were fixed.

A follow-up review of the 1.1 version in InfoWorld in 1988 noted the program was being repositioned from a power-user word processor to a power-user outliner with "word processing features" while raising the price to $295 from its original $125. They praised improvements in the outliner, rating most features as "very good" or "excellent". They continued to note the lack of spell checker and the poor overall speed, which they rated as "poor". They suggest the performance is usable for small one-page documents, but when it was "expanded to five pages, it was noticeably slow when copying text and saving files. At ten pages it was downright sluggish." This article went to press just as MindWrite 2.0 was being released, which added a 3rd party spell checker and numerous other features while claiming significantly improved speed.

Ted Silveira reviewed 1.1 for MacUser's February 1988 edition. He praised the integration of the program and noted that 1.1 fixed most of the more noticeable bugs and performance issues in 1.0, while adding support for AppleShare networks and the Mac Lightning spell checker. He was particularly happy with the window management options, which allowed multiple open documents to be easily organized and moved about even if they were not visible at the time. The improved speed fixed the overall problem but was noted as still being slower than Word during scrolling and global reformats. It concludes that "1.1 is a major improvement over the problem-ridden 1.0 - it not only fixes the outstanding problems but also feels solid where the earlier version did not." It concludes "In short, for all its fancy footwork, MindWrite stumbles over details" and receives a four-out-of-five rating.

In June 1987, InfoWorld published an article on the overall status of the Mac word processing market. By this point, Microsoft Word already held 56% of the market, with MacWrite at 31%, Write Now at 3% and MindWrite at 2%. All others together made up 8%. By the time 2.0 shipped in the spring of 1988, it was already seen as something of a minor story, being mentioned only in passing in a news item in InfoWorld.

== See also ==
- List of word processors
- List of old Macintosh software
- MORE (application)
- FullWrite Professional
