= RadarSync =

RadarSync PC Updater (known as RadarSync) is a driver and application update software program published by RadarSync Ltd. RadarSync's PC Updater offers a free scan and recommendations of updates to device drivers and software applications installed on a computer running Microsoft Windows. RadarSync does not store driver or software files on its servers, instead linking to the hardware or software vendor site for the files.

Like similar competing products which charge a membership fee for downloading the recommended updates, the free version of RadarSync does not download driver updates, a full paid version is required for that functionality. This functionality was initially available in the free version until sometime in 2009, when it was removed.

RadarSync is also known for maintaining a library of free links to drivers for Windows Vista.

== Included software ==
RadarSync's installation offers several free ad-on software, including the Ask toolbar, although it does not require installation of these products to use RadarSync.

== Competing Products ==
RadarSync competes against similar products such as those from DriverAgent, DriversHQ, VersionTracker, PC Pitstop, DriverGuide, Drivermagic, and others.

RadarSync is most similar to VersionTracker in function, in that both products provide updates of software and device drivers.
