= 2D computer graphics =

Computer-based generation of digital images

2D computer graphics is the computer-based generation of digital images—mostly from two-dimensional models (such as 2D geometric models, text, and digital images) and by techniques specific to them. It may refer to the branch of computer science that comprises such techniques or to the models themselves.

Raster graphic sprites (left) and masks

2D computer graphics are mainly used in applications that were originally developed upon traditional printing and drawing technologies, such as typography, cartography, technical drawing, advertising, etc. In those applications, the two-dimensional image is not just a representation of a real-world object, but an independent artifact with added semantic value; two-dimensional models are therefore preferred, because they give more direct control of the image than 3D computer graphics (whose approach is more akin to photography than to typography).

In many domains, such as desktop publishing, engineering, and business, a description of a document based on 2D computer graphics techniques can be much smaller than the corresponding digital image—often by a factor of 1/1000 or more. This representation is also more flexible since it can be rendered at different resolutions to suit different output devices. For these reasons, documents and illustrations are often stored or transmitted as 2D graphic files.

2D computer graphics started in the 1950s, based on vector graphics devices. These were largely supplanted by raster-based devices in the following decades. The PostScript language and the X Window System protocol were landmark developments in the field.

2D graphics models may combine geometric models (also called vector graphics), digital images (also called raster graphics), text to be typeset (defined by content, font style and size, color, position, and orientation), mathematical functions and equations, and more. These components can be modified and manipulated by two-dimensional geometric transformations such as translation, rotation, and scaling. In object-oriented graphics, the image is described indirectly by an object endowed with a self-rendering method—a procedure that assigns colors to the image pixels by an arbitrary algorithm. Complex models can be built by combining simpler objects, in the paradigms of object-oriented programming.

== Background (geometry) ==
A translation moves every point of a figure or a space by the same amount in a given direction.

In Euclidean geometry, a translation (geometry) moves every point a constant distance in a specified direction. A translation can be described as a rigid motion: other rigid motions include rotations and reflections. A translation can also be interpreted as the addition of a constant vector to every point, or as shifting the origin of the coordinate system. A translation operator is an operator $T_\mathbf{\delta}$ such that $T_\mathbf{\delta} f(\mathbf{v}) = f(\mathbf{v}+\mathbf{\delta}).$

If v is a fixed vector, then the translation T_{v} will work as T_{v}(p) = p + v.

If T is a translation, then the image of a subset A under the function T is the translation of A by T. The translation of A by T_{v} is often written A + v.

In a Euclidean space, any translation is an isometry. The set of all translations forms the translation group T, which is isomorphic to the space itself, and a normal subgroup of Euclidean group E(n ). The quotient group of E(n ) by T is isomorphic to the orthogonal group O(n ):

E(n ) / T ≅ O(n ).

=== Translation ===
Since a translation is an affine transformation but not a linear transformation, homogeneous coordinates are normally used to represent the translation operator by a matrix and thus to make it linear. Thus we write the 3-dimensional vector w = (w_{x}, w_{y}, w_{z}) using 4 homogeneous coordinates as w = (w_{x}, w_{y}, w_{z}, 1).

To translate an object by a vector v, each homogeneous vector p (written in homogeneous coordinates) would need to be multiplied by this translation matrix:

$$T_{\mathbf{v}} =
\begin{bmatrix}
1 & 0 & 0 & v_x \\
0 & 1 & 0 & v_y \\
0 & 0 & 1 & v_z \\
0 & 0 & 0 & 1
\end{bmatrix}$$

As shown below, the multiplication will give the expected result:

$$T_{\mathbf{v}} \mathbf{p} =
\begin{bmatrix}
1 & 0 & 0 & v_x \\
0 & 1 & 0 & v_y\\
0 & 0 & 1 & v_z\\
0 & 0 & 0 & 1
\end{bmatrix}
\begin{bmatrix}
p_x \\ p_y \\ p_z \\ 1
\end{bmatrix}
=
\begin{bmatrix}
p_x + v_x \\ p_y + v_y \\ p_z + v_z \\ 1
\end{bmatrix}
= \mathbf{p} + \mathbf{v}$$

The inverse of a translation matrix can be obtained by reversing the direction of the vector:

$$T^{-1}_{\mathbf{v}} = T_{-\mathbf{v}} . \!$$

Similarly, the product of translation matrices is given by adding the vectors:

$$T_{\mathbf{u}}T_{\mathbf{v}} = T_{\mathbf{u}+\mathbf{v}} . \!$$

Because addition of vectors is commutative, multiplication of translation matrices is therefore also commutative (unlike multiplication of arbitrary matrices).

=== Rotation ===
In linear algebra, a rotation matrix is a matrix that is used to perform a rotation in Euclidean space.

$$R =
\begin{bmatrix}
\cos \theta & -\sin \theta \\
\sin \theta & \cos \theta \\
\end{bmatrix}$$

rotates points in the xy-Cartesian plane counterclockwise through an angle θ about the origin of the Cartesian coordinate system. To perform the rotation using a rotation matrix R, the position of each point must be represented by a column vector v, containing the coordinates of the point. A rotated vector is obtained by using the matrix multiplication Rv. Since matrix multiplication has no effect on the zero vector (i.e., on the coordinates of the origin), rotation matrices can only be used to describe rotations about the origin of the coordinate system.

Rotation matrices provide a simple algebraic description of such rotations, and are used extensively for computations in geometry, physics, and computer graphics. In 2-dimensional space, a rotation can be simply described by an angle θ of rotation, but it can be also represented by the 4 entries of a rotation matrix with 2 rows and 2 columns. In 3-dimensional space, every rotation can be interpreted as a rotation by a given angle about a single fixed axis of rotation (see Euler's rotation theorem), and hence it can be simply described by an angle and a vector with 3 entries. However, it can also be represented by the 9 entries of a rotation matrix with 3 rows and 3 columns. The notion of rotation is not commonly used in dimensions higher than 3; there is a notion of a rotational displacement, which can be represented by a matrix, but no associated single axis or angle.

Rotation matrices are square matrices, with real entries. More specifically they can be characterized as orthogonal matrices with determinant 1:

$$R^{T} = R^{-1}, \det R = 1\,$$.

The set of all such matrices of size n forms a group, known as the special orthogonal group SO(n).

== Techniques ==
=== Direct painting ===
A convenient way to create a complex image is to start with a blank "canvas" raster map (an array of pixels, also known as a bitmap) filled with some uniform background color and then "draw", "paint" or "paste" simple patches of color onto it, in an appropriate order. In particular the canvas may be the frame buffer for a computer display.

Some programs will set the pixel colors directly, but most will rely on some 2D graphics library or the machine's graphics card, which usually implement the following operations:

- paste a given image at a specified offset onto the canvas;
- write a string of characters with a specified font, at a given position and angle;
- paint a simple geometric shape, such as a triangle defined by three corners, or a circle with given center and radius;
- draw a line segment, arc, or simple curve with a virtual pen of given width.

==== Extended color models ====
Text, shapes and lines are rendered with a client-specified color. Many libraries and cards provide color gradients, which are handy for the generation of smoothly-varying backgrounds, shadow effects, etc. (See also Gouraud shading). The pixel colors can also be taken from a texture, e.g. a digital image (thus emulating rub-on screentones and the fabled checker paint which used to be available only in cartoons).

Painting a pixel with a given color usually replaces its previous color. However, many systems support painting with transparent and translucent colors, which only modify the previous pixel values. The two colors may also be combined in more complex ways, e.g. by computing their bitwise exclusive or. This technique is known as inverting color or color inversion, and is often used in graphical user interfaces for highlighting, rubber-band drawing, and other volatile painting—since re-painting the same shapes with the same color will restore the original pixel values.

==== Layers ====
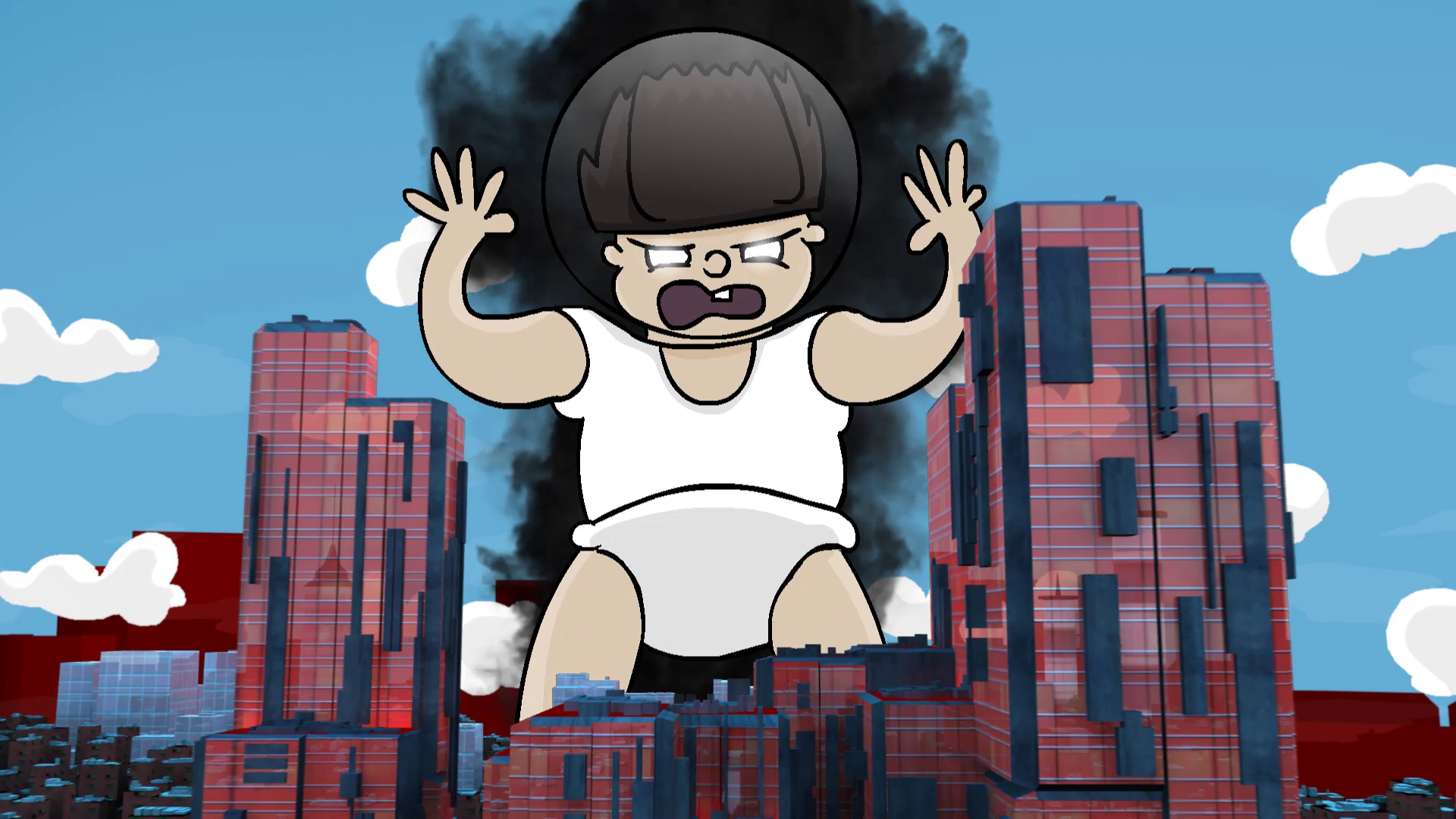
A 2D animated character composited with 3D backgrounds using layers

The models used in 2D computer graphics usually do not provide for three-dimensional shapes, or three-dimensional optical phenomena such as lighting, shadows, reflection, refraction, etc. However, they usually can model multiple layers (conceptually of ink, paper, or film; opaque, translucent, or transparent—stacked in a specific order. The ordering is usually defined by a single number (the layer's depth, or distance from the viewer).

Layered models are sometimes called "2 1/2-D computer graphics". They make it possible to mimic traditional drafting and printing techniques based on film and paper, such as cutting and pasting; and allow the user to edit any layer without affecting the others. For these reasons, they are used in most graphics editors. Layered models also allow better spatial anti-aliasing of complex drawings and provide a sound model for certain techniques such as mitered joints and the even–odd rule.

Layered models are also used to allow the user to suppress unwanted information when viewing or printing a document, e.g. roads or railways from a map, certain process layers from an integrated circuit diagram, or hand annotations from a business letter.

In a layer-based model, the target image is produced by "painting" or "pasting" each layer, in order of decreasing depth, on the virtual canvas. Conceptually, each layer is first rendered on its own, yielding a digital image with the desired resolution which is then painted over the canvas, pixel by pixel. Fully transparent parts of a layer need not be rendered, of course. The rendering and painting may be done in parallel, i.e., each layer pixel may be painted on the canvas as soon as it is produced by the rendering procedure.

Layers that consist of complex geometric objects (such as text or polylines) may be broken down into simpler elements (characters or line segments, respectively), which are then painted as separate layers, in some order. However, this solution may create undesirable aliasing artifacts wherever two elements overlap the same pixel.

See also Portable Document Format#Layers.

== Hardware ==
Modern computer graphics card displays almost overwhelmingly use raster techniques, dividing the screen into a rectangular grid of pixels, due to the relatively low cost of raster-based video hardware as compared with vector graphic hardware. Most graphic hardware has internal support for blitting operations or sprite drawing. A co-processor dedicated to blitting is known as a Blitter chip.

Classic 2D graphics chips and graphics processing units of the late 1970s to 1980s, used in 8-bit to early 16-bit, arcade games, video game consoles, and home computers, include:

- Atari, Inc.'s TIA, ANTIC, CTIA and GTIA
- Capcom's CPS-A and CPS-B
- Commodore's OCS
- MOS Technology's VIC and VIC-II
- Hudson Soft's Cynthia and HuC6270
- NEC's μPD7220 and μPD72120
- Ricoh's PPU and S-PPU
- Sega's VDP, Super Scaler, 315-5011/315-5012 and 315-5196/315-5197
- Texas Instruments' TMS9918
- Yamaha's V9938, V9958 and YM7101 VDP

== Software ==
Many graphical user interfaces (GUIs), including macOS, Microsoft Windows, or the X Window System, are primarily based on 2D graphical concepts. Such software provides a visual environment for interacting with the computer, and commonly includes some form of window manager to aid the user in conceptually distinguishing between different applications. The user interface within individual software applications is typically 2D in nature as well, due in part to the fact that most common input devices, such as the mouse, are constrained to two dimensions of movement.

2D graphics are very important in the control peripherals such as printers, plotters, sheet cutting machines, etc. They were also used in most early video games; and are still used for card and board games such as solitaire, chess, mahjongg, etc.

2D graphics editors or drawing programs are application-level software for the creation of images, diagrams and illustrations by direct manipulation (through the mouse, graphics tablet, or similar device) of 2D computer graphics primitives. These editors generally provide geometric primitives as well as digital images; and some even support procedural models. The illustration is usually represented internally as a layered model, often with a hierarchical structure to make editing more convenient. These editors generally output graphics files where the layers and primitives are separately preserved in their original form. MacDraw, introduced in 1984 with the Macintosh line of computers, was an early example of this class; recent examples are the commercial products Adobe Illustrator and CorelDRAW, and the free editors such as xfig or Inkscape. There are also many 2D graphics editors specialized for certain types of drawings such as electrical, electronic and VLSI diagrams, topographic maps, computer fonts, etc.

Image editors are specialized for the manipulation of digital images, mainly by means of free-hand drawing/painting and signal processing operations. They typically use a direct-painting paradigm, where the user controls virtual pens, brushes, and other free-hand artistic instruments to apply paint to a virtual canvas. Some image editors support a multiple-layer model; however, in order to support signal-processing operations like blurring each layer is normally represented as a digital image. Therefore, any geometric primitives that are provided by the editor are immediately converted to pixels and painted onto the canvas. The name raster graphics editor is sometimes used to contrast this approach to that of general editors which also handle vector graphics. One of the first popular image editors was Apple's MacPaint, companion to MacDraw. Modern examples are the free GIMP editor, and the commercial products Photoshop and Paint Shop Pro. This class too includes many specialized editors—for medicine, remote sensing, digital photography, etc.

== Developmental animation ==
With the resurgence of 2D animation, free and proprietary software packages have become widely available for amateurs and professional animators. With software like RETAS UbiArt Framework and Adobe After Effects, coloring and compositing can be done in less time.

Various approaches have been developed to aid and speed up the process of digital 2D animation. For example, by generating vector artwork in a tool like Adobe Flash an artist may employ software-driven automatic coloring and in-betweening.

Programs like Blender or Adobe Substance allow the user to do either 3D animation, 2D animation or combine both in its software allowing experimentation with multiple forms of animation.

== See also ==
- 2.5D
- 3D computer graphics
- Computer animation
- CGI
- 2D to 3D conversion
- Bit blit
- Computer graphics
- Graphic art software
- Graphics
- Image scaling
- List of home computers by video hardware
- Turtle graphics
- Transparency in graphics
- Palette (computing)
- Parallax scrolling
- Pixel art
- List of years in animation
