= MacPerspective =

- Version 4.0.5, showing viewport
- Developers: B. Knick Drafting, Inc.
- Release: 1985; 41 years ago
- Final release: 4.0.5 / 1989; 37 years ago
- Operating system: Classic Mac OS (System Software 5 – System 7)
- Available in: English
- Type: 3D modeling
- License: Proprietary

MacPerspective is a discontinued 3D modeling software package developed for the Macintosh. It was developed and distributed by B. Knick Drafting, Inc., of Melbourne Beach, Florida, and introduced in late 1985. It featured an intuitive system for creating wireframe models by specifying the x-, y-, and z-axis coordinates of lines to be drawn on the screen. It received positive reviews from critics.

== Features ==
MacPerspective is a 3D modeling software package designed primarily to generate wireframe perspectives and tracing masters from architectural and engineering drawings, allowing the completed object to be evaluated from any viewing angle. Upon launching the software, the user is prompted to specify coordinates for both the camera's position and direction in order to establish the viewport's initial projection. Users model 3D objects by entering numerical x-, y-, and z-axis coordinates representing the endpoints of line segments into a data field via the keyboard, which the software automatically converts and connects with straight lines. Users can also use the mouse to draw endpoints directly. The program sets a default origin point of x = 0, y = 0, and z = 0 at the lower left-hand corner of the viewport and features an on-screen coordinate box displaying the current cursor position. Coordinates can be defined using either decimal units or imperial units (feet and inches), both of which can be used within the same model. Coordinates can also be defined in relative terms, such as typing U8 to draw a line eight feet up from the previously defined point. To accommodate complex geometry, MacPerspective supports two coordinate systems: a fixed primary system to serve as a permanent frame of reference, and a variable secondary system to assist in drawing irregularly shaped objects at odd angles.

The software includes several automated features to assist in modeling, such as automatically closing a rectangle after the user draws the first two sides and allowing users to automatically draw a line to an existing point simply by clicking on it with the mouse. Line segments can be grouped into objects by clicking them individually or dragging a selection rectangle. These objects can then be deleted, repositioned, or copied and pasted into new locations. Adjusting the projection of the viewport allows users to distort the perspective for specialized viewing angles, such as bird's-eye or worm's-eye views. During construction, MacPerspective continuously rescales the entire object to fit the boundaries of the drawing window as lines are added or removed. Users can also zoom in on specific areas by dragging the mouse over a section.

Users can add up to 3,000 points for detailed rendering and can display and print the six principal primary views of a multiview orthographic projection, including top, bottom, front, back, left, and right views. It also can also display and print axonometric projections. Until version 4.0, the software was incapable of performing automatic hidden-line removal; to erase hidden lines representing edges on a solid object that would not visible from the camera's point of view in real life, MacPerspective required users remove these lines manually, one-by-one.

Finished drawings can be exported in the PostScript, PICT, and Adobe Illustrator Artwork (.ai) file formats for importing into other applications. They can also be output directly to printers such as the ImageWriter or LaserWriter at widths up to 100 inches, although plotters are not directly supported. Additionally, users can copy drawings (either in their entirety or as selected portions via the zoom tool) at any size to the clipboard for transferring into other applications (such as MacPaint) for final artistic touch-ups and stylized reproduction.

== Development ==
MacPerspective was developed and distributed by B. Knick Drafting, Inc., of Melbourne Beach, Florida, and introduced in late 1985. It was an early entrant in the field of 3D modeling software and CADD for the Macintosh, a computer platform which had been introduced in January 1984. Major new versions were released on a yearly basis, with version 2.0 released in late 1986 and version 3.0 released in mid-1987. Version 3.2B, released in mid-1988, added the ability to view the length of a selected line and added support for exporting models as Adobe Illustrator Artwork files. Up to at least version 3.2B, MacPerspective was capable of running on a stock Macintosh 512K. Version 4.0 was released in February 1989 and added the ability to remove hidden lines automatically. By December 1989, B. Knick Drafting had sold at least 2,000 copies of MacPerspective version 4.0.

== Reception ==
Reviewing version 2.0 for Macworld, Dennis R. Dornan called MacPerspective "a very practical program that is simple enough to have a wide range of applications". Dornan wrote that the software's "real value" was in creating 3D illustrations for larger documents and presentations rather than as a drafting suite. Dornan disliked its limited memory footprint preventing the creation of larger, more complex models and found the zoom tool clunky. C. J. Weigand of MACazine, also reviewing version 2.0, called it "a useful, labor-saving tool for specific drawing endeavors that require accurate use of perspective. In the right hands, MacPerspective can yield exceptional results while saving time and money". Weigand panned the lack of a built-in calculator applet for performing quick geometrical calculations, frequently necessary in architectural drafting. Both Dornan and Weigand found that because MacPerspective lacks a default projection for its viewport, users were liable to make errors in judging scale and that users were better off using the software to trace hand-drawn drafts prepared beforehand. Computer Graphics World on the other hand called it competent and versatile as a drafting tool rivaled only by a few other software packages for the Macintosh in 1986.

One prominent architect who used MacPerspective as late as the 1990s was Clovis Heimsath.

== See also ==
- MacDraft
