= Acta =

Acta or ACTA may refer to:

== Institutions ==
- Anti-Counterfeiting Trade Agreement, an intellectual property trade agreement
- Administrative Council for Terminal Attachments, a standards organization for terminal equipment such as registered jacks
- Alameda Corridor Transportation Authority, in southern California
- American Council of Trustees and Alumni, an education organization
- Atlantic County Transportation Authority, a transportation agency in Atlantic County, New Jersey
- Australian Community Television Alliance, an industry association representing community television licensees in Australia

== Science and technology ==
- Acta, the transactions (proceedings) of an academic field, a learned society, or an academic conference
- Acta (software), early outliner software
- Activin A, mammalian protein
- ACTA1, actin alpha 1 (skeletal muscle), human protein
- ACTA2, actin alpha 2 (smooth muscle), human protein
- Actin assembly-inducing protein, motility protein in the bacterium Listeria monocytogenes

== People ==
- Manny Acta (born 1969), American baseball coach

== Other uses ==
- Acts of the Apostles (genre) (Latin: Acta), Early Christian literature recounting the lives and works of the apostles of Jesus
- Acta, the acts of a church synod, otherwise called canons
