= MacProject =

Management application

- Screenshot of MacProject 1.0
- Developers: Solosoft, Claris
- Release: January 24, 1984; 42 years ago
- Final release: Pro 1.5 / 1993
- Operating system: System Software 6, System 7
- Type: Project management software
- License: Proprietary

MacProject was a project management and scheduling business application released along with the first Macintosh systems in 1984. MacProject was one of the first major business tools for the original Macintosh, which enabled users to calculate the "critical path" to completion and estimate costs in terms of money and time. If a project deadline was missed or if available resources changed, MacProject recalculated everything automatically. It was the evolution of LisaProject, another project management software package for the Apple Lisa.

== Development ==
MacProject was written husband-and-wife team Debra Willrett and Steve Young at Solosoft. It was published and distributed by Apple Computer to promote the original Macintosh Macintosh personal computer. It was developed from an earlier application written by Willrett for Apple's Lisa computer, LisaProject. This was the first graphical user interface (GUI) for project management. There were many other project management applications on the market at the time, but LisaProject was the first to simplify the process by allowing the user to interactively draw their project on the computer in the form of a PERT chart. Constraints could be entered for each task, and the relationships between tasks would show which ones had to be completed before a task could begin. Given the task constraints and relationships, a "critical path", schedule and budget could be calculated dynamically using heuristic methods.

One of the early proponents of MacProject was James Halcomb, a well-known expert in the use of the critical path method. Using a Lisa computer paired with an early CRT projector, Mr. Halcomb traveled the United States demonstrating this new technology in his CPM courses. In consultation with the software's developers he authored the book Planning Big with MacProject, which introduced a generation of Mac users to PERT and CPM.

A completely rewritten version of MacProject, called MacProject II, was introduced by Claris, a spin-off of Apple, in January 1988 as part of its inaugural lineup of Mac office applications. This was followed by MacProject II 2.0 in 1989 and MacProject Pro in 1992.

In 1991, Microsoft Project was ported to the Macintosh from Microsoft Windows and became MacProject's main competitor. However, after the release of version 4.0 of Microsoft Project in 1995, Microsoft terminated support for the Macintosh release. MacProject itself was discontinued by Claris in 1997.

MacProject 1.0 is not Y2K-compliant as it cannot schedule tasks past 1999.

== See also ==
- MacPaint
- MacWrite
- MacDraw
- List of project management software
