= DBASE Mac =

dBASE Mac
- dBASE Mac 1.01
- Developer: Ashton-Tate
- Stable release: 2.0 / 1995
- Operating system: Classic Mac OS
- Type: database management system
- License: Proprietary

dBASE Mac was a database management system for the Apple Macintosh, released by Ashton-Tate in 1987. Although the GUI was lauded in the press, the application was so slow that it became something of a joke in the industry. Sales were dismal, and Ashton-Tate eventually decided to give up on dBASE Mac and instead port dBASE IV to the Mac, complete with a DOS-like interface. The product was then sold to a series of third-party developers, but they had little success and it disappeared from the market in the mid-1990s.

== History ==
=== Genesis ===
dBASE Mac started life at a third-party developer, DigiCorp, a small two-person company in Salt Lake City. They had attempted to market it through other companies in 1984 as Hayden: Base via Hayden Software, a Mac publisher, TheBase and then °Base (Dot-Base, referring to a part of its internal syntax), but the product was not really ready and the deals fell through.

Just before Christmas 1984, Ashton-Tate started negotiations with the developers, completing the deal early 1985. The developers moved to A-T's Glendale Development Center (where the PC versions of dBASE were developed) early in 1985. Development resumed in May, referred to by the code-name Dottie, referring to the earlier Dot-Base naming.

=== Changing priorities ===
At first the idea was to produce something similar to DigiCorp's original design, releasing a 1.0 in early 1986 and then following with a major upgrade late that year. However the product quickly became fouled in Ashton-Tate's management, who used it as a dumping ground for every buzzword feature that came along. Eventually the original 1.0 design was abandoned and the decision was made to move directly to what was to have been the 2.0 release, the most notable change being to include an object oriented programming language. Sometime during this period, management saw the product as a migration path for all versions of dBASE, using the Mac as a testing ground before releasing it on the PC as well, thereby replacing their now-ageing dBASE core with a fully GUI-hosted object-oriented database.

Apple had long evangelized Ashton-Tate on developing for the Mac, considering them to be one of the "big players" they needed to legitimize the Mac marketplace. Although Apple's upper management remained committed to this vision, after waiting three years since the release of the Mac, others in the company were becoming increasingly frustrated with the seemingly never ending development cycles. Things came to a head when Guy Kawasaki convinced Apple to option a new advanced database program then known as "Silver Surfer". Ashton-Tate threatened to stop all Mac development, and Apple quickly acquiesced and dropped their option. Kawasaki responded by starting his own company and marketing the product as 4th Dimension. Another delay followed as Ashton-Tate asked for multiple tweaks and new features to ensure dBASE Mac would compete with this new and competitive product.

By late 1986 the product was starting to gel, about the time the original 2.0 would have shipped. Management decided to market it as dBASE Mac, even though it had nothing in common with its PC counterpart. The developers were worried that customers would not be impressed with getting a product that was called dBASE only to find it didn't even work with the DOS version. In order to provide some commonality the system could use dBASE databases by building an additional external index file, but it still required the users to re-build their application logic and forms in the new system.

=== Release and reviews ===
The product finally shipped in the summer of 1987, just before MacWorld Boston. (Note: This document claims the release date was September 1987. This seems to be widely quoted, but this date disagrees with other sources.)

As the developers had feared, reviewers universally panned the product because it did not interact directly with dBASE on the PC. Don Crabb's review in InfoWorld was succinct, noting that "DBase Mac is not DBase for the Mac". Reviewers also universally noted the slow performance, one going so far to state it was difficult to tell if the program had crashed, which it did a lot, or was simply taking a long time to complete a task. Another pointed out that even the included example programs were uselessly slow, noting "As for the video store application, customers would have time to view the movie and return the tape in the time it took dBASE Mac to update records."

A 1.01 version fixing most of the bugs was released in April 1988, but by this time the damage was done and 4th Dimension was garnering critical praise. The company abandoned the idea of using the Mac as a testing ground for all future versions of the system, dooming it to remain an orphan. A year later Ashton-Tate gave up on the product entirely, and decided to instead port their latest PC database, dBASE IV, to the Mac.

=== Third-party development ===
Ashton-Tate sold off the rights for dBASE Mac in June 1990 to a former dBASE Mac user who formed New Era Software Group to continue development. At the time they quoted 35,000 users.

New Era released an update in late November as nuBASE Mac 1.3. 1.3 proved to be considerably more stable and faster than the Ashton-Tate versions, although this did little to help given the product's reputation, which the press considered undeserved by this point. 1.3 also added the ability for the product to call HyperCard XCMD's, which allowed it to use the variety of plugins from the HyperCard world.

In late 1991 the company suffered a major theft which slowed development of the follow-up version, originally planned to be a 2.0. Instead, in the spring of 1992 they released a "32-bit clean" nuBASE Pro 1.5, which allowed it to run on Apple's latest operating systems and PowerMac machines. At the same time the product was modified to allow it to act as a pure front-end to a new nuBASE LAN Manager 1.5 server.

Although what happened at this point is not clear, either New Era folded or changed names. The new release, renamed to nuBASE Pro 1.5, followed from Tactic Software. Once again the rights changed hands, this time to Dolphin Software who released a version as nuBase Pro 2.0 in 1995. Their plans to port it to Windows went nowhere, and once again the product disappeared, the rights reverting to the original author from the 1980s.

=== Discontinuation ===
Sales of the product in the post Ashton-Tate era appear to have been close to zero, and the product is still best remembered under its original name. In this form it has been called a "killer app", but in a non-traditional sense that it helped kill the company, and the reputation of Apple with it.

Meanwhile, dBASE IV turned out to be a huge disaster on the PC causing Ashton-Tate to struggle financially. The company was purchased by Borland in 1991, and development of all of Ashton-Tate's Mac products ended.

== Description ==
In common with most database applications today, dBASE Mac had two basic "modes", one for designing the database itself, and another for building forms to interact with it. In this case dBASE Mac was lauded for both, some describing it as "the right way to do a Mac database".

== See also ==
- FullWrite Professional
- Full Impact
