= MacDraft =

Computer-aided design (CAD) program for Mac OS X

MacDraft is a 2-D computer-aided design (CAD) program for Mac OS X, which can be used to create drafts, illustrations and architectural plans. Unlike pixel-based drawing programs like MacPaint, MacDraft is vector and object-based, fully scaled drawing system. MacDraft is a feature-rich and flexible 2D CAD software for architects, engineers and construction services as well as professional CAD users, designers, educators and hobbyists.

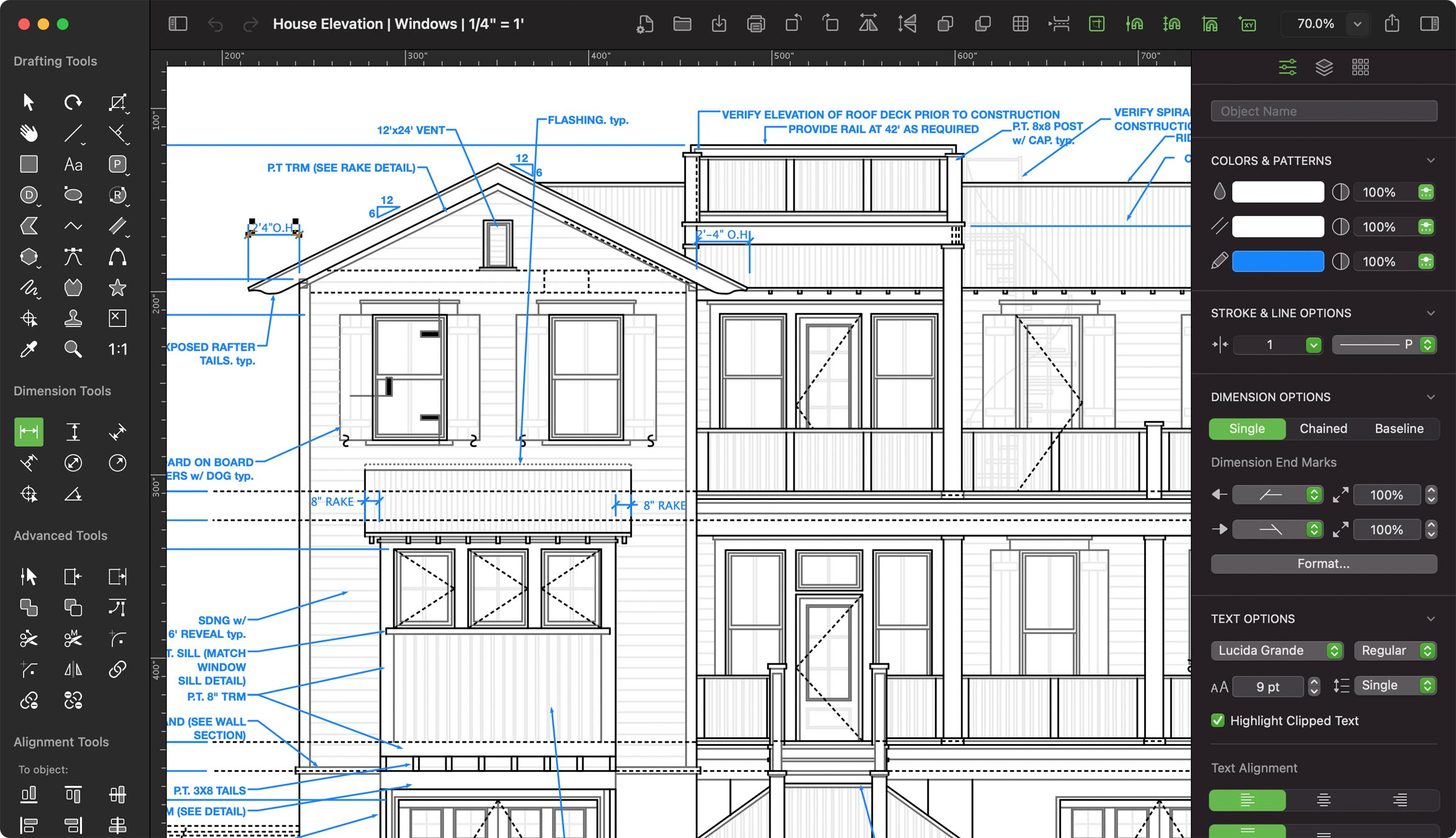
MacDraft Elevation Drawing

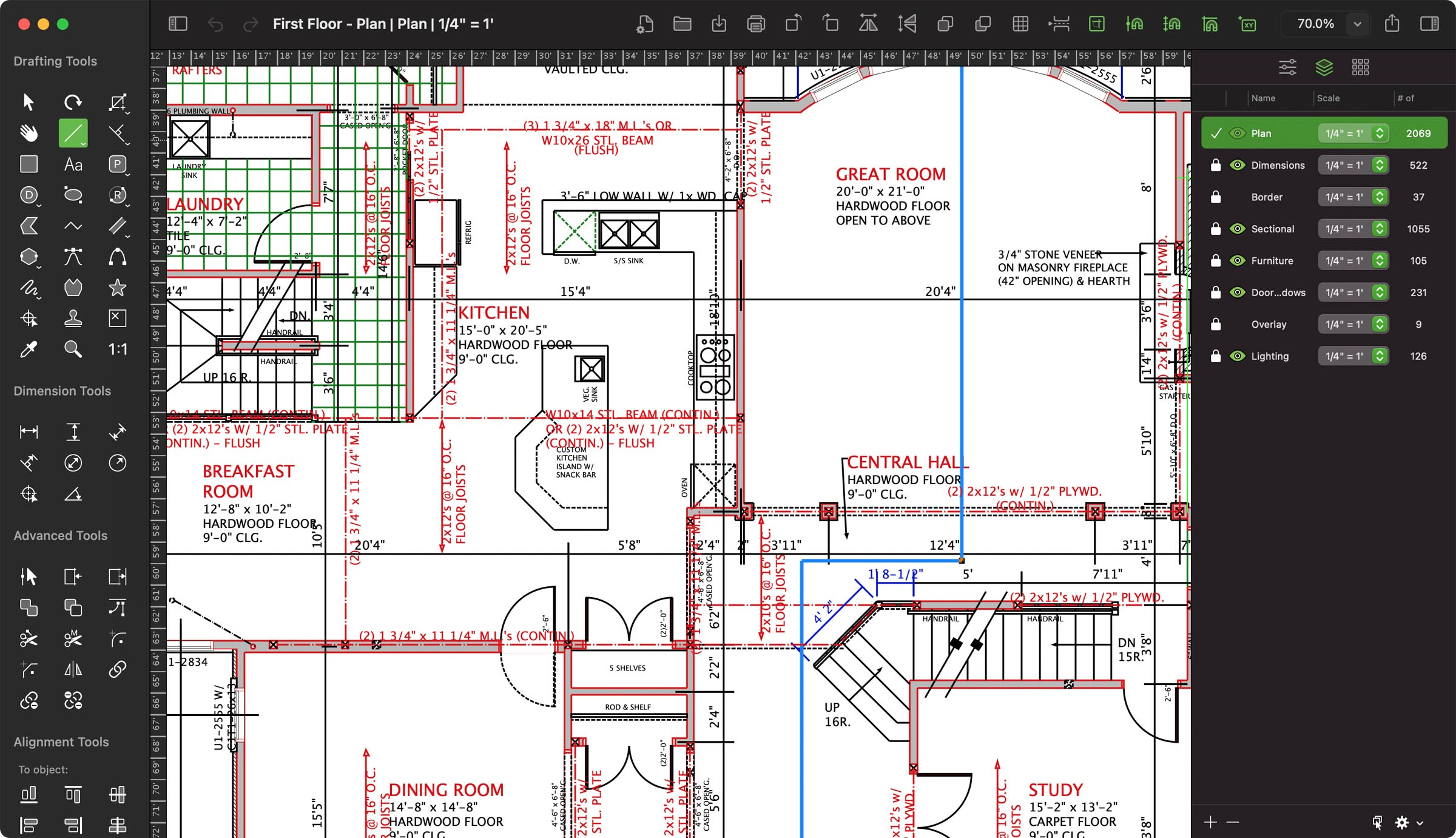
MacDraft Floor Plan Drawing

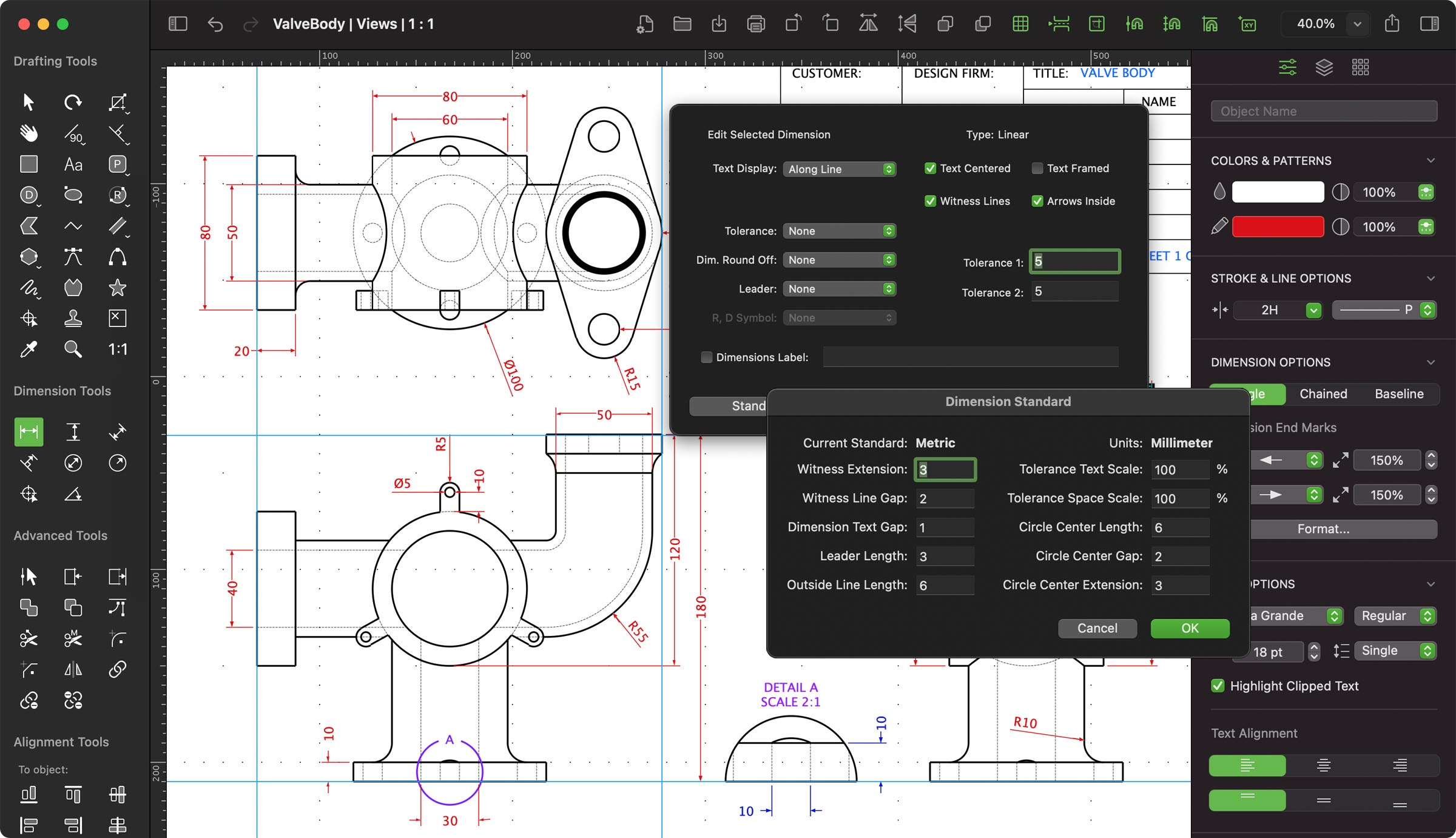
MacDraft Orthographic Engineering Drawing

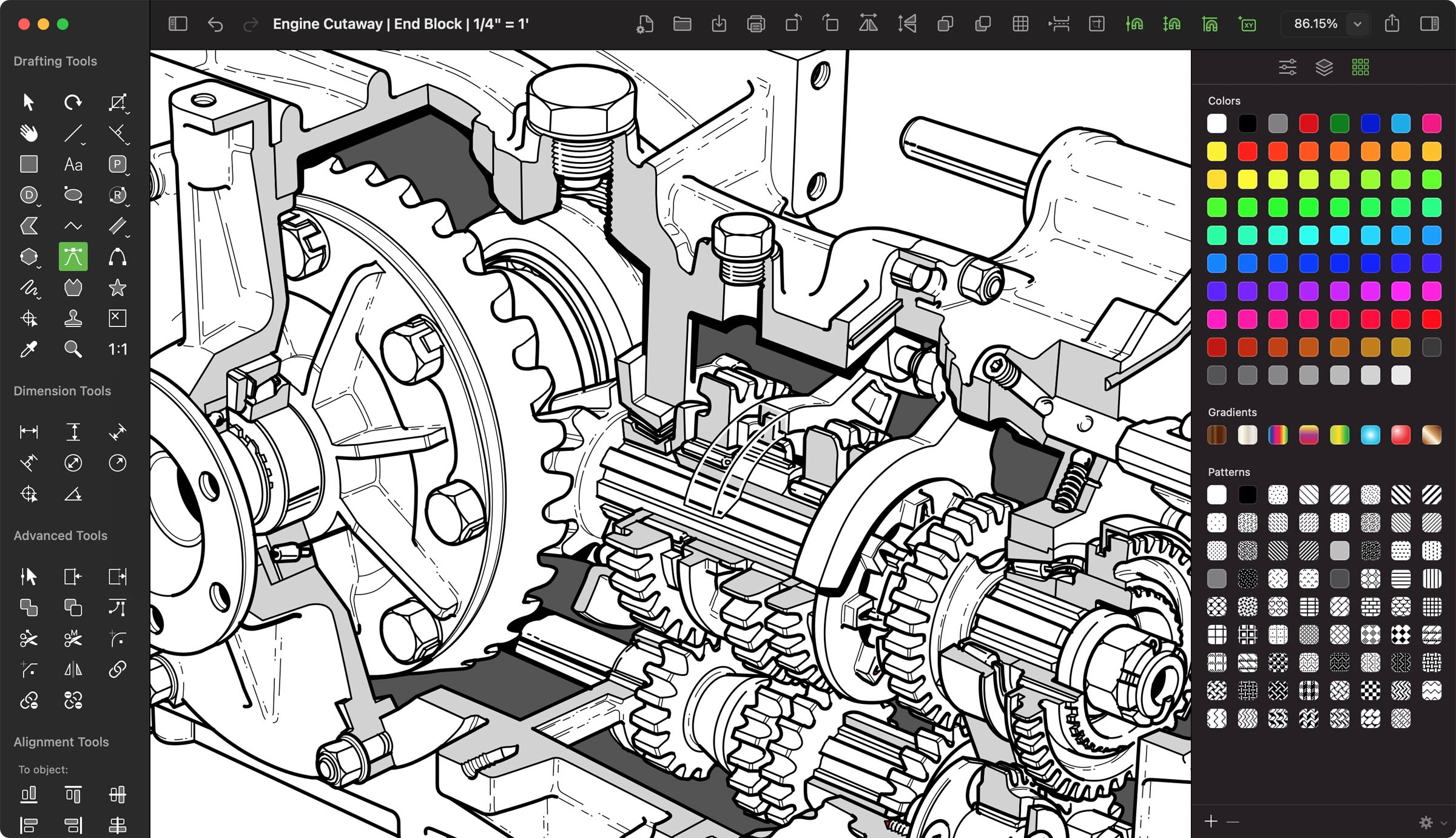
MacDraft Cutaway Technical Drawing

MacDraft Garden And Landscape Design Drawing

MacDraft was first released in 1984 by Innovative Data design. A later version was called Dreams, but this nomenclature did not last long. The MacDraft program was later acquired by Microspot, an English software company, and its latest version is called MacDraft Professional. Microspot also releases a Windows version called PC Draft. Microspot are still developing and selling MacDraft now.
