= Steve Brecher =

American poker player (born 1945)

- Born: 1945 (age 80–81)

World Series of Poker
- Money finishes: 20
- Highest WSOP Main Event finish: 31st, 2011

World Poker Tour
- Title: 1
- Final tables: 3
- Money finishes: 17

Steve Brecher (born 1945) is an American professional poker player.

== Poker career ==
In 1999, Brecher placed 8th in the World Series of Poker $2,500 No Limit Hold'em event for $15,000. In 2004, he reached the final table of the World Poker Tour $25,000 No Limit Championship, finishing in 6th place and winning $232,000. In 2005, he finished 3rd in the $9,700 No Limit Hold'em event at the United States Poker Championship, pocketing $218,250.

In 2009, Brecher took his first major tournament title by winning the WPT Bay 101 Shooting Star tournament. He beat over 300 other players to win more than $1 million, defeating Kathy Liebert heads up after the longest final table in WPT history. He finished 31st in the 2011 World Series of Poker Main Event, winning $242,636. In the Season 11 WPT Borgata Poker Open Championship Event, Brecher finished in the 5th place and won $206,821.

As of 2023, his live tournament winnings exceeded $3 million.

== Computer programming career ==
Before turning his hand to professional poker, Brecher was a computer programmer and writer who was instrumental in creating some of the earliest popular programs (and their product categories) for the Macintosh platform. He wrote Suitcase, the font management program for the Mac, which was originally self-published under the brand Software Supply, later distributed by Fifth Generation Systems, and eventually acquired by Extensis, which still publishes a (greatly improved and rewritten) version of the program more than 20 years after Brecher's original release. He also, together with Billy Steinberg, wrote Pyro, the original Mac screen saver application. In addition to application software, Brecher was a contributor to the FreePPP project, which brought Macintosh computers onto the Internet, and developed low-level driver software for some of the earliest Macintosh hard disk drives.

In the 1980s and early 1990s, Brecher was regarded in technology circles as a "programmer's programmer", and was a Contributing Editor of MacTech magazine, for which he wrote the Ask Professor Mac column, and answered technical questions from readers. His later interest in professional gambling was foreshadowed by his 1980 book, Beating the Races with a Computer.

== Miscellaneous ==
Brecher holds an FAA Airline Transport Pilot certificate, and during 2009–2012 flew himself to poker tournaments around the country from his plane's bases in Reno, Nevada and Carson City, Nevada.
