= LightningPaint =

Grayscale bitmap graphics editor for Apple Macintosh personal computers

LightningPaint was a monochrome, grayscale bitmap graphics editor for the Apple Macintosh series of personal computers. Written in Lightspeed C, the program was similar to MacPaint, but distributed as shareware long after Apple stopped bundling MacPaint with new computers.
