= Full Impact =

Spreadsdheet program

- Developer: Ashton-Tate
- Release: August 1988; 38 years ago
- Platform: Apple Macintosh
- Type: Spreadsheet

Full Impact was a spreadsheet program for the Apple Macintosh computer released by Ashton-Tate in the late 1980s. Full Impact was known for excellent graphing and visual display, far better than contemporary versions of Microsoft Excel. But this was also its only really compelling feature, and it was unable to find a market niche given the dominance of Excel in the Macintosh marketplace.

== History ==
Full Impact started in a roundabout fashion when early Apple employee and programmer Randy Wigginton decided to write a spreadsheet program. Wigginton had left Apple during the Macintosh development process to start Encore Systems with two friends, Don Breuner and Ed Ruder. They were soon hired by Steve Jobs to develop a word processor for the soon-to-be-released Macintosh, which would become MacWrite. Wigginton wanted to duplicate this success by making a GUI-based spreadsheet that would be easier to use than anything on the market. Unlike a word processor, however, a spreadsheet requires a complex "engine" to quickly solve the many equations that make it up.

Starting in September 1984, shortly after the Mac's release, Wigginton and his two partners started looking for an engine, and were introduced to Richard Ross by an Apple employee. They agreed that Encore would adapt a GUI to Ross's engine, which would become MacCalc. It was not long before these plans started to fall apart. Ross wanted to retain control the product and sell it through his company, Bravo Technologies, while Wigginton and his partners felt it would be much wiser to license it to a larger company, and that Ross was pushing them out of the decision making. Eventually they decided to look for another partner, and shortly thereafter Wigginton met with several employees of Ashton-Tate and presented a demo of their existing prototype program. Ashton-Tate was interested, and agreed to fund development of the product in exchange for marketing rights.

They used the prototype GUI created for MacCalc along with a new engine, Alembic, (written by Queue Associates) and almost completely rewritten by Les Vogel to create the Glass project, also known as Pegasus. This head start should have allowed the product to ship fairly quickly. Instead, Ashton-Tate vacillated between being extremely interested in the Macintosh market, considering it a way to break out of their dBASE-dominated PC line, and then being completely ambivalent about it. This vacillation appears to have been based largely on Mac sales reports; when sales were up the Mac was Ashton-Tate's next big thing, when sales dropped it was not worth bothering with. When interested, Encore's development funds would arrive on time—when they were not, the money would disappear for months. The Encore team was repeatedly forced to take on other projects in order to pay the bills, stretching what should have been a short project into a several-year ordeal.

Then, just when the product was finally ready to ship, Ross decided to sue Ashton-Tate, claiming he had rights to the program. Ross lost the case and today it is considered one of the classic examples of intellectual property rights law. Ross went on to release his version as MacCalc, and gained very positive reviews.

With the lawsuit out of the way, the product finally started shipping in August 1988, with the new name Full Impact. A minor upgrade, 1.1, followed in December. Reviews were generally positive, noting in particular how the system allowed you to have up to eight "subsheets" within any document. This feature is common today, but at the time it was considered novel and extremely useful. Full Impact was also one of the first spreadsheets to allow typing data and formulas directly into the cells, a feature that is still fairly poorly implemented today. Reviewers were also pleased with the powerful macro language, which included functionality such WHILE loops. But certainly the most lauded feature was that Full Impact allowed you to include other objects, such as text blocks, charts or pictures, directly on top of the sheets. At the time, most spreadsheets displayed these items in separate views.

After the delays, the timing turned out to be particularly bad. Microsoft had recently shipped Excel 3.0, which was off to a strong start. Only shortly after Full Impact was released, Informix Wingz shipped, and was heavily marketed—including sending their frontman, Leonard Nimoy, around to various Macintosh-related trade shows. Ashton-Tate positioned the product as a "presentation spreadsheet" to focus on its graphics capabilities, but it seems the term meant as much to potential customers then as it does today.

Sales of Full Impact were predictably soft as a result, as were Ashton-Tate's other Mac products, FullWrite Professional and dBASE Mac, which suffered from various problems. Ashton-Tate did not take this as a signal to fix them, and instead ignored all of the products for the next year or so. Finally, in late 1989, a round of upgrades to FullWrite and Full Impact were announced. Full Impact 2.0s was released in 1990, including 3-D charts and the ability to include voice notes, a major feature of a coincident release of FullWrite 1.5s as well. A separate release in 1989 added Clear Access at $99, a 3rd party database linking technology based on Apple's CL/1.

But this was also the point at which Ashton-Tate's cash cow, dBASE, failed. In 1990, they released dBASE IV, which was so buggy that customers generally refused to use it. Many took this as an opportunity to try out similar products, and discovered that FoxPro and Clipper had been better than dBASE for some time already. The company was soon bleeding money and gave up on the Mac market, ending development of their entire suite.

By 1991, the company was becoming insolvent and was purchased by Borland for cents on the dollar. Unfortunately, Borland had their own spreadsheet battling with Excel on Windows, Quattro Pro, and they immediately ended sales of Full Impact. Attempts by the authors to take back the product failed, and it disappeared.

== Reception ==
Diana Gabaldon wrote in BYTE that Full Impact had better graphics and was easier to use than the comparably priced Excel, with good documentation. She lamented its slow performance and "gluttonous appetite for memory", reporting that the software needed 2 MB of RAM and hard drive, and that Excel was noticeably faster with larger files.

== See also ==
- dBASE Mac
- FullWrite Professional
