= Randy Wigginton =

Early Apple employee

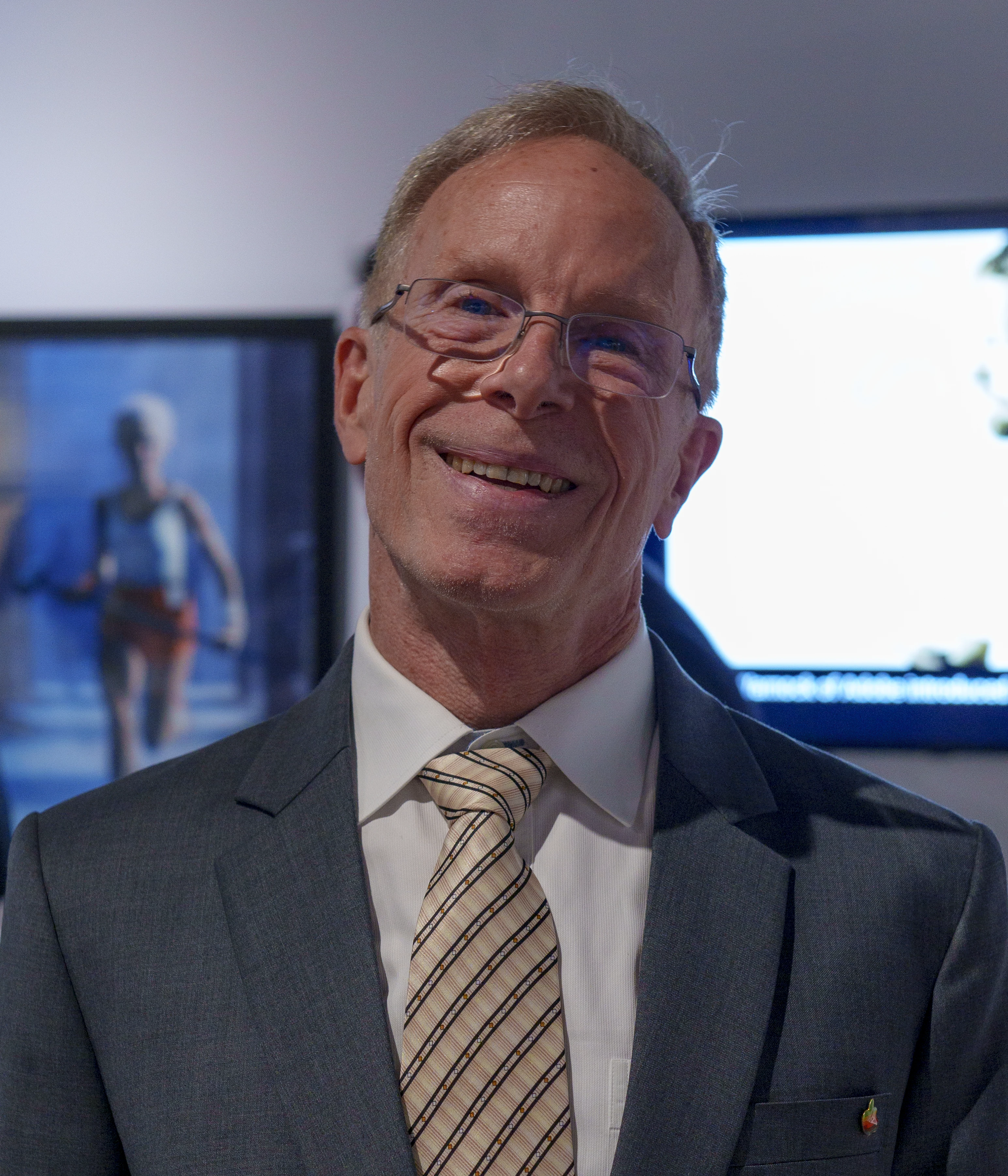
- Wigginton in 2026
- Occupations: Software engineer, Square, Inc.
- Years active: Apple, Inc. (1976-1985)
- Known for: Creator of MacWrite, Full Impact
- Children: 2

Randy Wigginton was Apple Computer's sixth employee, creator of MacWrite, Full Impact, and numerous other Mac applications. He used to work in development at eBay, Google Inc., Quigo, Inc and Move.com.

== Early life ==
Wigginton was a student at Bellarmine College Preparatory in San Jose, California, interested in computers just as the earliest microprocessor-based computers were being assembled by hobbyists. Around the age of 14, he had heard about the Homebrew Computer Club, but had no way to get there until he started getting rides with another club member, Steve Wozniak, who lived down the street from Wigginton's family home. The two became friends, and Wigginton became one of Apple's earliest employees in 1976, and was present with Wozniak when the Apple I was first presented to the world at a Club meeting.

== Career ==
Wigginton collaborated with Wozniak on the circuit design and ROM software for the Apple II in 1977. As Wozniak wired up color graphics circuitry, Wigginton wrote machine language graphics subroutines, and Chris Espinosa, another high school student, wrote demo programs in BASIC. Wigginton wrote several early programs for the Apple II, including a checkbook-balancing program co-authored with Apple's vice-president of Marketing Mike Markkula. Wigginton was one of the Apple employees who adapted Microsoft's 6502 BASIC for the Apple II; it was dubbed Applesoft BASIC. The Applesoft BASIC Reference Manual includes a section entitled "Rounding can be Curious", in which it is documented that the ROUND function, which rounds a number to a prescribed accuracy, is not monotonic: in other words, for some x and y, such that x<y, ROUND(x)> ROUND(y). (The problematic ROUND function does not appear in Applesoft II, the version that most Apple II users are familiar with.)

Perhaps his most critical early contribution was the RWTS (read/write track-sector) routines for the Disk II, the 5 1/4" floppy disk controller introduced at the Consumer Electronics Show (CES) show in early 1978. Wigginton and Wozniak finished the software in Las Vegas, working through the night before the show opened.

In 1979, Apple President Mike Scott asked Wozniak to write a secret competitor to VisiCalc, to use as leverage against Personal Software. Wozniak was reluctant because he was unsure whether creating a rival spreadsheet software would be copyright infringement, so Scott ordered Wigginton to do so. With help from Wozniak and Gull Banks, Wigginton developed The Spreadsheet, codenamed "Mystery House". He later claimed that it "became the most incredibly intense political football you can imagine ... the product was completed and had manuals when Apple decided not to sell it". Call-A.P.P.L.E. in 1982 briefly distributed it before Apple withdrew permission, making The Spreadsheet a cult classic because of the rarity and Wozniak's involvement. Wozniak wrote the math routines as they could be used for other software, Banks wrote disk routines, and Wigginton wrote most of the code.

Wigginton was a member of the original Apple Macintosh design team. Wigginton left Apple in September 1981 and formed Encore to work on his own. However, he was quickly contracted by Apple to help work on MacWrite on a semi-formal basis. When the Macintosh shipped in 1984 he again turned to his own projects, starting a new spreadsheet program that would eventually be released as Full Impact.

Following his career at Apple, Wigginton worked as an engineer at companies including eBay, Google, Chegg, and Square, Inc., among others. In November 2010, he left his position as a "site reliability engineer" at Google Inc., purportedly after leaking news of a $1,000 holiday cash bonus to employees.

== Awards and Honors ==
Wigginton was inducted into the Mimms Museum of Technology and Art Hall of Fame in March 2026 for his work on AppleSoft BASIC, the Disk II disk drive, and the MacWrite word processor.
