= 4-Sight Fax =

Fax software

4-Sight Fax is a fax server program for Apple Macintosh computer systems, produced by Soft Solutions Inc., USA.

Now on its 7th version, the server can handle an unlimited number of users, and may be accessed by a variety of means, including a virtual printer and supplied client software. It can run on Mac OS X and Mac OS 9 systems.

The supplied client software allows the server to be configured on a per-user basis, with settings for junk handling, archiving, and receipt confirmation, among other features. It is available in versions for Mac OS X, Mac OS 9, and Windows.

== See also ==
- Fax server
