= Panorama (database engine) =

Panorama is a database engine and development environment for Macintosh and Microsoft Windows. It was one of the first applications available for Mac OS, in 1984.

== Overview ==
Panorama is database software for the Apple Inc. Macintosh and Microsoft Windows. It is a product of ProVUE Development. According to its owner Jim Rea, ProVUE is the oldest third-party software company (apart from Microsoft) developing software for the Macintosh personal computer.

Panorama is notable for the fact that the databases it creates are RAM-based, making them extremely fast. That said, as disk speeds and OS and application memory caching have improved, this speed benefit becomes less and less evident as years go by. Panorama is not as popular as FileMaker, its main competitor, though it has outlasted many similar products. What it lacks in conforming to standard application conventions it makes up for in its potential for customisation, incorporating a powerful scripting language.

The current version of Panorama, now called PanoramaX, is 10.2.

PanoramaX was released in November 2017.
