= Bert Monroy =

American artist

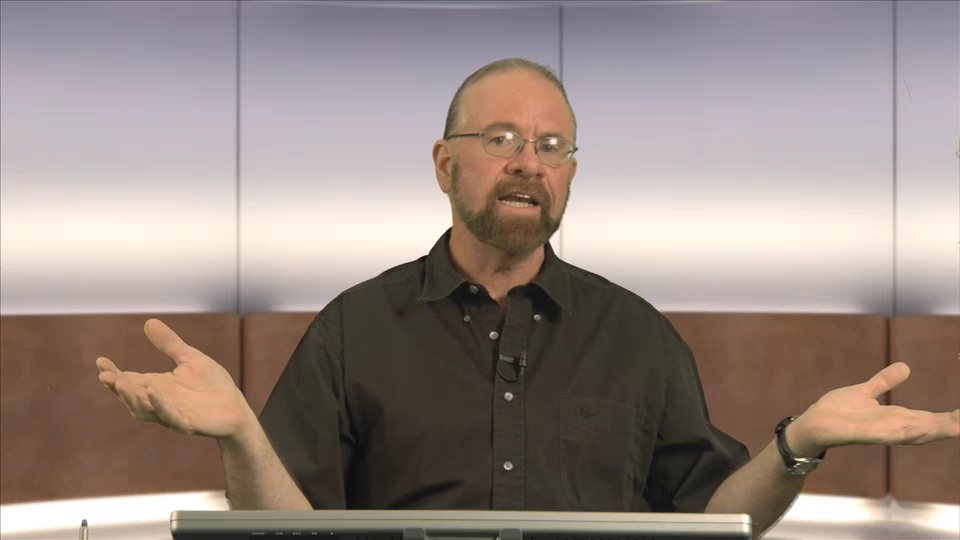
Monroy hosting PixelPerfect on Revision3

Bert Monroy is an American artist best known as an early Photoshop expert. He wrote the first book on the use of Photoshop (The Official Adobe Photoshop Handbook, coauthored with David Biedny), and became an established Photoshop educator. He was a frequent guest on The Screen Savers, where he gave brief Photoshop tutorials. In 2004 he was inducted into the Photoshop Hall of Fame. He also hosted a web TV show, PixelPerfect, on Revision3. Monroy is currently a regular teacher on the training website Lynda.com and hosts an ongoing series called Pixel Playground which is similar to Pixel Perfect.

David Pogue includes an anecdote about Monroy on page 341 of his book Apple: the First 50 Years. In Pogue's telling, a chance meeting between Monroy and Apple executive Phil Schiller on an airplane led 3 months later to Monroy -- described as "one of the world's foremost experts in Photoshop" -- being key to the success of a presentation of the Power Mac G3 in November 1997.
