= FreePPP =

FreePPP is a Point to Point Protocol (PPP) implementation for computers running the classic Mac OS. FreePPP was widely considered the first working and most stable version of PPP for Apple Macintosh and led many PPP internet service providers to support Macintosh users for the first time.

Besides the overall stability, usability was a large factor in the popularity of this implementation. A menu bar icon was introduced that gave users easy access to common tasks such as dialing and disconnecting. Modems were "auto-detected", keeping users from having to find and configure an init string for their modem (a common stumbling block for users). FreePPP was installed by a "lite" version of the commercial Internet Setup Monkey product, whose producer Rockstar Studios was a primary contributor to FreePPP. The installer included cartoon images of a monkey installing software on the computer.

== Early history ==
FreePPP 1.0, the first version, was simply a repackaging of MacPPP from Merit Network; MacPPP developed for the most part by Larry Blunk. MacPPP was actually the first PPP for the Mac OS but was unstable and prone to error. The source code was made freely available and various users released fixes for common bugs. Steve Dagley aggregated most of those patches to MacPPP and added ISDN functionality. He re-released it as FreePPP in early 1994.

== Adoption by Apple ==
FreePPP 2.5, the most popular version, was the result of Apple Computer getting involved in the development of MacPPP. Steve Dagley contacted Apple about his work with FreePPP and convinced Apple to use it for its Internet software, Cyberdog. An Apple engineer, Richard Reynolds, rewrote most of FreePPP, greatly improving stability.

Richard left Apple to form Rockstar Studios along with Brian Chen, creator of the immensely popular screensaver from Berkeley Systems, "After Dark". Apple allowed Richard to take his work with him to Rockstar and continue it. Consequently, Steve Dagley and Richard (along with Rockstar) created The FreePPP Group to manage the distribution and licensing of FreePPP. Steve Dagley developed an all-new control panel that included location management. Rockstar Studios contributed PPP Menu and The Internet Setup Monkey. The Internet Setup Monkey included a cartoon monkey, developed by Matt Small, that appears to tear apart a computer, install FreePPP then put it back together. Rockstar sold this installer to Internet Service providers. This was a time when most operating systems did not come with any form of TCP networking support, requiring separate installation before its users could connect to the Internet. Installation and configuration issues were a common problem for both users and ISPs.

Apple released a version of FreePPP under the old name MacPPP and included it in a few minor System 7.5.x releases. Open Transport eventually included a completely new PPP developed by Apple directly into Mac OS but many users choose FreePPP for its advanced and easy to use features. Eventually Rockstar Studios released a version of PPP Menu that supported Open Transport PPP (OT/PPP), consequently FreePPP users slowly migrated to Open Transport PPP. FreePPP is still widely available for users of older Macintosh hardware that cannot run Mac OS X. One of the most popular features of FreePPP is still included in macOS today. macOS includes a menu bar icon that allows users to open and close a PPP connection as well as configure PPP.

== Legacy ==
As of 2004, Steve Dagley works for Netscape on the Mac OS version of Netscape Communicator. Richard Reynolds still works at Rockstar Studios. Rockstar Studios released software centered on FreePPP and Open Transport PPP though the late ’90s then changed its name to Rockstar Software and it changed its focus to Microsoft Windows based Internet account setup software. The company once again changed its name to Aramova, Inc. and changed its focus to Wireless software. Aramova does not seem to have any macOS products at this time.

== Contributors ==
Besides Steve Dagley and Richard Reynolds, other contributors in the FreePPP group are Mike Alexander, Yan Arrouye, Steve Brecher, Jim Browne, Alec Carlson, Tom Evans, Joe Husk, Cliff McCollum, Edward Moy, Tom Shaw and John Stephen. Most of the initial patches the Steve Dagley aggregated came from these contributors.
