= FullWrite Professional =

Word processor application for the Apple Macintosh

- FullWrite Professional 1.5s box cover
- Developer: Ashton-Tate
- Stable release: 2.0.6 / 1995
- Operating system: Classic Mac OS
- Type: Word processor
- License: Proprietary / Freeware

FullWrite Professional was a word processor application for the Apple Macintosh, released in late 1988 by Ashton-Tate. The program was notable for its combination of a true WYSIWYG interface, powerful long-document processing features, and a well regarded outliner. It was also noted for its high resource demands, bugs, and its very late release.

Despite these problems, FullWrite developed a faithful following and some amount of commercial success. Douglas Adams used FullWrite as his primary word processor for some time. Douglas Hofstadter published several of his books directly from FullWrite, notably Le Ton beau de Marot.

The product changed hands in the aftermath of Ashton-Tate's early 1990s business failure, and most of its problems were addressed in a major upgrade in 1995. By this point Microsoft Word dominated the Mac word processor market and the improved FullWrite never became particularly widely used. Since 1998, the product has been available as freeware for the classic MacOS.

== History ==
=== FullPaint ===
When the Macintosh was first released in 1984, MacWrite and MacPaint were bundled with the system. Originally it was intended this would last only for the first 100 days, after which they would be for sale. The deadline for the unbundling continued to be pushed back as there was a dearth of new releases for the Mac, and they continued to be bundled until the release of the Mac Plus in 1986.

The presence of these programs led to a catch-22 situation. Although MacPaint had any number of obvious limitations, like allowing only one document to be opened and not directly supporting scroll bars, it served the needs of many of the users who were purchasing the systems and made the market for replacements limited to higher-end users. The limitations of the machines, notably the small amount of memory, made it difficult to build significantly more powerful software that might attract a higher-end audience. Instead of complete applications, a number of add-on products emerged. For instance, ClickArt Effects and Paint Cutter were popular add-ons that filled in for features missing in MacPaint.

With the ending of the bundling arrangement, Ann Arbor Softworks decided to take on the MacPaint market with the release of FullPaint in 1986. It followed the MacPaint interface closely, but allowed large images to be scrolled, added a number of new tools, and could open up to four documents at once to cut and paste between them. It was very well received and would become the first program to make major sales into the MacPaint space.

With this success, the company opened a sales office and changed their official address to Newbury Park, California, although most of the company, notably development, remained in Ann Arbor, MI.

=== FullWrite ===
Like MacPaint, MacWrite dominated the early Mac software market, and like MacPaint, it did this despite serious limitations. MacWrite introduced a semi-WYSIWYG GUI to word processor users, and many of its conventions remain as standards today - selecting text with a drag of the mouse and then cutting it, for instance. However, as it held the entire document in memory, and memory of the era was limited, MacWrite was only usable for documents up to about eight pages long.

With FullPaint successfully competing against MacPaint, the target for the company's next product was a similarly expanded replacement for MacWrite. Like FullPaint, the new product would include a true GUI display, expand the capabilities of the program to allow it to work with larger documents, and combine features seen in other programs and add-ons. Among its many new features was multi-column layouts, flowing text around irregular objects (normally images), automatic creation of indexes and table of contents, among others. It also, like FullPaint, more closely followed the Mac interface, allowing the user to work in a page view that exactly matched the output, as opposed to MacWrite's semi-WYSIWYG display. FullWrite also included the ability to attach notes to any object in the document, whether that be paragraphs, images or outliner items.

Another emerging concept that fed into the development of FullWrite was a number of recently introduced outliner products, notably the seminal MORE, released on the Mac in June 1986. Outliners allowed the user to jot down quick topic headings and then expand them at any time, including the ability to re-arrange the document simply by dragging the appropriate header to a new location. MORE led to significant interest in the market and the underlying concept of a hierarchical view that could be used to reorganize a document had a natural fit with long-document preparation that FullWrite was targeting. FullWrite's outliner was used to drive the creation of various lists like the table of contents, semi-automating that task, and by using the notes feature one could quickly jot down an outline of the document and then leave notes about what to put in each section.

=== Development ===
Development started in April 1986 and pre-release advertising was launched in December announcing that it would be released in January 1987 at a price around $300. It was first shown to the public at MacWorld Expo in January 1987 with the promise that it would be released later that year. The date continued to be pushed further back. In March, Computer Reseller News reported it was being readied for April, but by August MacWEEK reported it to be "a month away" and a November issue claimed that the documentation was complete but the program was not.

By this point the product had become something of a joke in the Mac world, winning numerous (unofficial) vaporware awards. Microsoft released Microsoft Word 3.0 in 1987, and Ann Arbor responded by taking out a two-page advertisement headlined DON'T BUY IT, stating that FullWrite was "a superior word processor, at a better price ... at your store within 60 days". This date was also missed.

Just prior to the January 1988 MacWorld Expo, where the company planned to ship the product, Ann Arbor was purchased by Ashton-Tate, with whom discussions had been underway for some time. The acquisition was kept a secret. At the Expo, instead of shipping, the company gave away 10,000 copies of the current beta version to drum up some buzz. This version contained an easter egg which would convert selected text into pig Latin if the user held down the right keys. The demo version of FullWrite completely filled a floppy disk, and FullWrite would crash if it did not have disk space available. Therefore, when potential customers launched the program directly off of the floppy (which was full), the program would crash. Ashton-Tate made tens of thousands of these demo disks, and was converting less than 0.1% of them to sales.

=== Shipping ===
FullWrite 2.0.6 with a sample document open. The images shows the full-page display that was a hallmark of the program. The document has two floating text blocks, one containing the automatically updated table of contents, the other simple "call out" text.

After minor edits to change the copyright notices from Ann-Arbor to Ashton-Tate and updating the packaging, the program finally shipped as version 1.1 on 27 April 1988, at a suggested retail price of $395.

Reviews of FullWrite were generally positive, and it reviewed well on feature comparisons. (Note: An InfoWorld review of high-end applications from August 1988 rated it higher than Microsoft Word and the Mac version of Word Perfect. See Assadi, Barbara (8 August 1988). "Word Processors". InfoWorld. Vol. 10, no. 32. pp. S13–S26.) They also generally noted a number of bugs and generally slow performance. One reviewer found that a fast typist could out-type the editor on even a reasonably fast machine like the SE/30. Many reviews also found the interface confusing and difficult to learn, a problem that was not helped by the fact that the "Learning" manual was just a rearranged version of the reference manual.

A more serious problem was that the program needed 1 MB of RAM to work at all, and 2 MB and a hard drive to work comfortably. This was at a time when most new Macs shipped with 1 MB and used floppies for storage, and when users were starting to take advantage of the multitasking features offered by System 6's MultiFinder, using up a portion of that RAM. Some reviews suggested "paring down" the operating system or purchasing more RAM. To make matters worse, Ashton-Tate downplayed the amount of memory required rather than admitting how much was really needed.

Nevertheless, the product managed to gather a small following. For those users with machines capable of running it, it delivered on its purpose with a Mac interface. It was perhaps the first program on the Mac that could be used to write large documents and books, owing to its outliner.

=== Follow-up releases ===
The program managed to provide most word-processing features, but it was in need of additional cleanup and attention to performance and memory footprint. Ashton-Tate, however, never addressed these issues. Three minor versions were released in 1989 and 1990: 1.5, and 1.5s. These fixed many bugs and some minor features, and 1.5s added a rarely used ability to add sound notes to documents (thus the "s" version). They also bundled an external product known as Tycho TableMaker to address that hole, but it was not well integrated, as one might expect from an external program. Microsoft Word released a major upgrade in 1988, 4.0, and Ashton-Tate never responded.

After 1990 the product was at a standstill. During this time Ashton-Tate's cash cow, dBASE, was performing poorly in the market. dBASE IV for IBM PC compatibles was released the same year as FullWrite and customers were abandoning it for the various dBASE clones like FoxPro and Clipper. By 1990 Ashton-Tate was in serious financial trouble, and was eventually purchased by Borland in 1991.

Work was underway on a cross-platform version of FullWrite, but Borland's purchase effectively ended all Mac development. In response, Ann Arbor Softworks (which still existed to serve customers of its other products) sued Borland, complaining that Ashton-Tate had failed to market the program successfully. The suit was dismissed, and analysts noted that had it gone forward, Borland and other large companies would be open to copy-cat suits from any disgruntled former developer.

=== Continued development ===
In late 1993 Borland sold off the product to Akimbo Systems, a small company started by Roy Leban, one of FullWrite's original developers. Akimbo immediately patched it to work on System 7, the latest Macintosh operating system at the time, and released the result as version 1.7.

A greatly updated FullWrite 2.0 (dropping "Professional") followed early in 1995, adding a number of new features including AppleScripting, importers/exporters based on Claris's XTND, a built-in table editor, an extensive and powerful plug-in architecture (including a pig Latin plug-in), and support for the "EGO Protocol" which used AppleEvents to allow in-place editing of graphics. The most important change was a major effort concentrating on performance and memory footprint, which was reduced by about 500 kb, allowing it to run somewhat smoothly in only 700 kb. Reviews were very positive; now the main concerns were the odd menu layout that made some commands difficult to find, and the lack of a cascading style system.

The new version was fairly well received, but by this time, Microsoft Word's stranglehold on the Mac market was complete. Akimbo re-used the layout engine to produce a new HTML-editing tool known as Globetrotter Web Publisher, designed to allow people who did not know HTML to publish complete web sites, but it gained only a scant following. After several years of small sales, Akimbo decided to release FullWrite 2.0.6 as freeware in 1998 when the company shut down. Globetrotter was not similarly released because of its use of the GIF patent, for which Unisys insisted royalties be paid, even on free copies.

== Reception ==
InfoWorld was highly impressed in their July 1988 review, saying that while it was "one of the longest anticipated software producing in computer history" that it was nevertheless "proves to be worth the wait." Lauding many of the powerful features, the documentation and overall ease of use, their only significant concerns were size and speed, noting that on a 1 MB machine "it performed significantly slower overall than the other packages" and rated the speed as "poor". They gave it an overall rating of 7.1, or "very good".

Diana Gabaldon wrote in BYTE in February 1989 that FullWrite was, like Full Impact, "a memory hog".

Writing about the 2.01 release in April 1995, Robert Echardt of MacWorld called the original 1.0 release was a "...slow and unwieldy memory hog but had a panoply of features that were the envy of every other high-end word processor." He contrasted that with the new versions from Akimbo as "the leanest of all high-end word processors... faster and more responsive than earlier versions."

== Opening legacy documents ==
FullWrite only ran on macOS 7–9, and no version was ever written for Mac OS X. This left users with potentially hundreds or thousands of documents that can only be opened on the older operating systems. As of the 15th of July 2019, LibreOffice is the only modern word processor that opens FullWrite files on a modern Mac.

== See also ==
- dBASE Mac
- Full Impact
- List of word processors
