= Taste (software) =

Macintosh word processor

Taste is a Macintosh word processor that combined a number of basic features from page layout software—just a "taste" of it—to build a unique solution to preparing documents. Taste was originally offered by DeltaPoint, the publishers of the famed MindWrite, but was eventually spun off to a third party before finally disappearing. Taste works with Mac OS 9, but not macOS, and has not been available for purchase for several years. In many ways Apple's recent Pages application shares the basic "idea" of Taste, combining word processing with page layout.

Originally expected to retail for $99 in the low-end of the word processing market, Taste included a graphical page layout with an integrated drawing package and an address book with the capability of mail-merging. The product was available in 1991 for $149 with a scope of features found in many typical word processing packages, such as spelling checking, graphs and contents page generation. Like a word processor, Taste allowed the user to simply start typing and continue doing so until they were finished. There was no need, as in a typical page layout program, to create a box to hold the text, or manually add pages or link columns as the document grew. Like a page layout program, Taste also allowed the user to add these boxes if needed, as well as adjust the distance between characters (kerning) or between lines in a paragraph. Fairly complex graphics can be created within this program.

Oddly Taste also lacks a number of features of MindWrite, although it appears to have been written by an entirely different programming team. For instance, Taste does not have a built-in outliner, the "killer feature" of MindWrite which made it a favorite for many years. Nor does Taste include features like sorting or list generation.

== Reception ==
Taste was released in early 1991.

Ted Landau of MacUser awarded version 1.01 four stars out of five, praising the sophistication of its graphics-creation tools and deeming it more capable than MacWrite and WriteNow, both of which were more expensive at the time. However he called the word processing features less than advanced and noted a number of bugs that "can begin to erode your confidence in the reliability of an otherwise outstanding program", including text sometimes not being drawn onto the next line after being wrapped.

Macworld magazine gave version 1.02 two stars out of five, with reviewer Michael Miley calling Taste well-priced for its feature set and its interface clearly laid out and easy to use. Ultimately he found it a slow performer and prone to crashes when importing large Word files.

Journalists for Byte reviewed the same version and found it flexible as a word processor with "strong" page layout features that are easy to configure but disliked the separation of the text and graphics functions, and, like Landau, they encountered some difficulty with word wrapping. They concluded that "If the material you write often gets poured into a page-layout program, you can save some time, effort, and money with Taste".

== See also ==
- List of word processors
