= SuperPaint (Macintosh) =

1986 graphics software for Apple Macintosh

Aldus SuperPaint

- Aldus SuperPaint 3.5 running on Mac OS System 7.5.1
- Developer: Silicon Beach Software
- Release: 1986; 40 years ago
- Stable release: 3.5 / 1993
- Operating system: System 4–System 7
- Platform: Classic Mac OS
- Type: Bitmap and vector-based image editing
- License: Proprietary

SuperPaint is a graphics program capable of both bitmap painting and vector drawing. SuperPaint was one of the first programs of its kind, combining the features of MacPaint and MacDraw while adding many new features of its own.

It was originally written by William Snider, published by Silicon Beach Software (which was acquired by Aldus Corporation in 1990), and released in 1986 for the Apple Macintosh. William Snider wrote and designed the program from his house on an Apple Lisa in Pascal. It was the only program that outsold Silicon Beach's Dark Castle games, but SuperPaint was much more lucrative for the company, representing about 70% of the revenue. The program and packaging was also localized into Japanese.

As it requires Classic, SuperPaint is unsupported as of Mac OS X version 10.5, but can still be used with the assistance of emulators.

== History ==
- Version 1.0, released in 1986, has a fixed-position user interface with palettes arranged on the left and bottom edges of the screen. Includes LaserBits 300dpi editing mode and the ability to print in color despite only being able to display in black & white.
- 1.1, released in 1988, included the SuperConvert app to convert to/from LaserBits; was bundled with Microsoft Word 4.0 for Macintosh in 1990.
- 2.0, released in 1989, introduced many new features including: AutoTrace, SuperBits (formerly LaserBits), freehand Bézier tool, multi-page documents, rich text in text blocks, rotation and transformations, plug-ins, a multi-palette user interface, custom tools in the paint palette.
- 3.0, released in 1991, was a major revision that added many extra features, most notably color support, but also image enhancement functions and texture fills; hotkeys were revamped to simplify the interface; tear-off palettes.
- 3.5, released in 1993, brought support for System 7, copy brush tool, several other new drawing tools including some that are pressure sensitive, expanded importing capability including still frames from QuickTime. This was the final version of the app.

Later versions were published by Aldus after their 1990 acquisition of Silicon Beach Software. The application continued to be sold by Adobe after their 1994 takeover of Aldus.

== Plug-ins ==
In 1988, alongside version 1.1, an SDK (software development kit) was released that allowed the creation of software plug-ins to add features and capabilities to SuperPaint.

Many plugins were created and shared, including some that added support for pressure-sensitive pens such as those made by Wacom.

== Later use ==
Artist Richard Bolam used images drawn using Aldus SuperPaint in the 1990s as part of his "Bolam at 50" exhibition in 2014. Naoki Yamamoto is seen using SuperPaint in the Documentary Urasawa Naoki no Manben in season 4, episode 3 (broadcast in 2017).
