= VersionTracker =

Defunct software distribution website

- Website type: Software versioning tracker
- Owner: CNET
- Commercial: Yes
- Registration: Optional
- Launched: 1995; 31 years ago
- Current status: Integrated into Download.com

VersionTracker was a website that tracked software releases and versioning. It began as a Mac OS software tracker, eventually expanding into Mac OS X, iPhone, Microsoft Windows and Palm OS software.

VersionTracker did not host the majority of the software listed - it merely linked to them.

Browsing and searching the database was free. Paid users had access to a streamlined download process and the VersionTracker Pro software application. VersionTracker Pro tracked software versions on the user's computer and compared those versions to VersionTracker's database.

== History ==
VersionTracker was created by Kurt Christensen, a Sacramento, CA native in 1995. It started as an Apple-only site but eventually expanded to include software related to the Microsoft Windows and Palm Pilot platforms.

Upon the advent of Mac OS X, the Macintosh section was split into Classic Mac OS and a section devoted to software for the new operating system. As releases of software for the older Mac OS dried up, its section was discontinued.

In August 2007, VersionTracker and sister sites MacFixIt and iPhone Atlas became CNET sites. CNET's Download.com promotes VersionTracker heavily on its website, through ads and following file downloads, although without specifically referencing its ownership of CNET.

On September 7, 2010, VersionTracker became fully integrated into the CNET site structure and merged with Download.com. The software update tracking features are all still available, but the old layout is no longer used. Daily updates for programs are listed, and users can download CNET's TechTracker utility for maintaining their installed software through the Download.com site. The VersionTracker URL is no longer active.

The old VersionTracker Pro utility (TechTracker's predecessor) has been known to have had the lowest rating of 1 star for a long time to this day, even after being heavily promoted by CNET. The new version of the software has been heavily overhauled and integrates with the CNET account and website. There are currently no equivalent star ratings for the new version of the software.

The Unofficial Apple Weblog (TUAW) has various posts from former VersionTracker users who seem to be migrating to MacUpdate rather than using CNET, which no longer includes the wealth of information formerly available at VersionTracker after 15 years of user reviews.

As always-on broadband internet connections became the norm, developers began incorporating update-checking features directly into their applications, reducing the audience for sites like VersionTracker. App stores like the Mac App Store, in which applications can be searched, purchased, and kept up to date, further reduced the audience for VersionTracker, and download sites in general.
