= Acta (software) =

Acta was a software program for creating outlines. It was originally developed for the Apple Macintosh and released in 1986. Acta started as a Desk Accessory, presumably to be used in conjunction with a Word Processor.

In 1987 Version 1.3 was bundled with MORE, which was at the time published by Living Videotext.

Opal, from A Sharp LLC, is the updated Mac OS X version of this software.
