= PixelPaint =

Raster graphics editor

PixelPaint is a pixel-based image editor application by Pixel Resources, Inc., a Norcross, GA based company, and distributed by SuperMac Technology, no longer maintained, for the Macintosh series of computers.

It was the first full-color paint application for the Macintosh.

Jerry Harris, co-creator of PixelPaint, subsequently became an executive for Adobe Systems.

== Reception ==
BYTE in 1989 listed PixelPaint as among the "Distinction" winners of the BYTE Awards, stating that it "helped establish the Mac II ... as a tool for serious graphic art".
