= MacDraw =

Vector graphics drawing application

- Developers: Apple Computer, Claris
- Release: 1984; 42 years ago
- Written in: Pascal
- Operating system: System Software 6, System 7
- Type: Vector-based drawing
- License: Proprietary

MacDraw is a discontinued vector graphics drawing application released along with the first Apple Macintosh systems in 1984. MacDraw was one of the first WYSIWYG drawing programs that could be used in collaboration with MacWrite. It was eventually adapted by Claris and, in the early 1990s, MacDraw Pro was released with color support. MacDraw was the vector-based cousin of MacPaint.

In the preface of the third edition of Introduction to Algorithms, the authors make an emphatic plea for the creation of an OS X-compatible version of MacDraw Pro.

== Early versions ==
MacDraw was based on Apple's earlier program, LisaDraw, which was developed for the Apple Lisa computer which was released in 1983. LisaDraw and MacDraw were developed by the same person, Mark Cutter.

The first version of MacDraw was similar to that of MacPaint, featuring the same tools and patterns. However, MacDraw is vector-based, meaning that an object's properties and placement can be changed at any time. MacDraw includes features for printing and also integrates with MacWrite via cut-and-paste. MacDraw is more advanced than MacPaint, featuring a grid and the ability to change the drawing dimensions. However, MacDraw lacks support for using more than one document at a time and also lacks zooming capabilities. MacDraw is especially useful in drawing flowcharts, diagrams and technical drawings.

== Later incarnations ==
MacDraw II (1988) was a complete rewrite of the original MacDraw. It was developed at Apple by project leader Gerard Schutten and team members Amy Goldsmith and Marjory Kaptanoglu, and was released by Claris. MacDraw II introduced color and many other missing features and was also enhanced for the Macintosh II. MacDraw eventually evolved into MacDraw Pro (1991) and ultimately ClarisDraw (1993). The final version of ClarisDraw was 1.0v4 (1994). It runs without difficulties on PowerPC-based Macs under Classic Mac OS and the Mac OS X Classic Environment (which is included in Mac OS X 10.4 Tiger and earlier).

Dekorra Optics have a version of their EazyDraw software, EazyDraw Retro, that can open documents produced by the various incarnations of MacDraw, including ClarisDraw. Later versions of LibreOffice support MacDraw files as well, but only if the file type 'Legacy Mac Drawing' is manually selected.

== Reception ==
MacUser in November 1988 rated MacDraw II 1.0v1 3.5 mice out of 5. The magazine approved of its continued "elegant simplicity" and much faster speed, but wished for a better object library, non-opaque fill modes, and .pict version 2 support. Noting that "Now $395, the price of MacDraw II has also accelerated quite a bit", the magazine concluded that "it doesn't take advantage of all the power that the Mac II has to offer, especially when it comes to color".
