= MacPaint =

Graphics editing software by Apple Computer

- A picture in MacPaint 1.0
- Developers: Apple Computer, Claris
- Release: 1984; 42 years ago
- Final release: 2.0 / January 24, 1988; 38 years ago
- Written in: Pascal
- Operating system: Classic Mac OS; (System 1, 2, 3, 4, 5; System 6; System 7)
- Type: Raster graphics editor
- License: Proprietary

MacPaint image
- Filename extension: .pntg
- Type code: PNTG
- Uniform Type Identifier (UTI): com.apple.macpaint-image
- Developed by: Apple Computer
- Type of format: Image file

MacPaint is a discontinued raster graphics editor developed by Apple Computer and released alongside the original Macintosh personal computer on January 24, 1984. It was sold bundled with its word processing counterpart, MacWrite, for US$195. MacPaint was notable because it could generate graphics that could be used by other applications. It taught consumers what a graphics-based system could do by using the mouse, the clipboard, and QuickDraw picture language. Pictures could be cut from MacPaint and pasted into MacWrite documents.

The original MacPaint was developed by Bill Atkinson, a member of Apple's original Macintosh development team. Early development versions of MacPaint were called MacSketch, still retaining part of the name of its roots, LisaSketch. It was later developed by Claris, the software subsidiary of Apple which was formed in 1987. The last version of MacPaint was version 2.0, released in 1988. It was discontinued by Claris in 1998 because of diminishing sales.

== Development ==
MacPaint was written by Bill Atkinson, a member of Apple's original Macintosh development team. The original MacPaint program consisted of 5,804 lines of Pascal computer code, augmented by another 2,738 lines of 68000 assembly language. MacPaint's user interface was designed by Susan Kare, also a member of the Macintosh team. Kare also beta-tested MacPaint before release.

MacPaint allows users to edit a 576-by-720 pixel, 72-dpi bitmap (slightly wider than the screen, and slightly more than twice as tall as the screen). A drawing canvas occupies most of the screen real estate, offering a viewport into a portion of the bitmap, with toolbars and pattern palettes around it.

MacPaint uses two offscreen memory buffers to avoid flicker when dragging shapes or images across the screen. One of these buffers contained the existing pixels of a document, and the other contained the pixels of its previous state. The second buffer was used as the basis of the software's undo feature. In April 1983, the software's name was changed from MacSketch to MacPaint. The original MacPaint was programmed as a single-document interface. The palette positions and sizes were unalterable, as was the document window. This differed from other Macintosh software at the time, which allowed users to move windows and resize them.

=== FatBits ===
The original MacPaint did incorporate a double zoom function. Instead of a zoom function, a special magnification mode called FatBits was used. FatBits showed each pixel as a clickable rectangle with a white border. The FatBits editing mode set the standard for many future editors. MacPaint included a "Goodies" menu which included the FatBits tool. This menu had been named the "Aids" menu in prerelease versions, but was renamed "Goodies" as public awareness of the AIDS epidemic grew in the summer of 1983.

== Release and version history ==
MacPaint was first advertised in an 18-page brochure in December 1983, following the earlier announcement of the Macintosh 128K. The Macintosh was released on January 24, 1984, with two applications, MacPaint and MacWrite. For a special post-election edition of Newsweek in November 1984, Apple spent more than US$2.5 million to buy all 39 of the advertising pages in the issue. The Newsweek advertisement included many pages dedicated to explaining how MacWrite and MacPaint worked together. After launch, a New York Times reviewer noted how MacPaint unfolded numerous graphic possibilities for the personal computer; he went further to say "it is better than anything else of its kind offered on personal computers by a factor of 10."

MacPaint 2.0 running on System 7

MacPaint 2.0 was released on January 11, 1988, by Claris. It added many improvements to the software, including the capability to open and use up to nine documents simultaneously. The original MacPaint operated as a single-document application with an immovable window. MacPaint 2.0 eliminated this limitation, introducing a fully functioning document window, which could be sized up to 8 x 10". Several other features were introduced, such as a Zoom tool, MagicEraser tool for undo actions and stationary documents. MacPaint 2.0 was developed by David Ramsey, a developer at Claris. MacPaint 2.0 was sold for US$125, with a US$25 upgrade available for existing users of MacPaint. Claris discontinued technical support for the original MacPaint in 1989. Claris stopped selling MacPaint in early 1998 because of diminishing sales.

Since 2010, MacPaint 1.3's source code (written in a combination of Assembly and Pascal) has been available through the Computer History Museum, along with the QuickDraw source code, a library to draw bitmapped graphics, due to the support of Steve Jobs.

MacPaint inspired other companies to release similar products for other platforms; within a year a half-dozen clones existed for the Apple II and IBM PC. Some of these included Broderbund's Dazzle Draw for the Apple II, Mouse Systems' PCPaint for the PC, and IBM's Color Paint for the IBM PCjr.. PC Paintbrush was among those early clones and was later licensed and adapted to Microsoft Paint.

An unofficial update by Mac Aspect called MacPaint X was released for Mac OS X as a donationware beta in 2008. It was intended as a simple drawing program for learning to draw on a computer or for quick sketches on Apple's then current operating systems.

== Version history ==
Version	Release date	Release information
1.0	January 24, 1984	Initial release with System Software 1.0
1.3	May 1984	Released with System Software 1.1
1.4	September 1984	Released with Macintosh 512K
1.5	April 1985	Released with System Software 2.0
2.0	January 1988	Last release
