= XTND =

Document import/export system

XTND was a document import/export system developed by Claris for their products on the Apple Macintosh. Products supporting XTND placed an additional popup menu in the open and save dialogs, allowing users to read and write documents of any supported format. The name is a four-letter contraction of extend, the Mac using four-letter identifiers in its system resource files.

XTND was first introduced in 1989 with MacWrite II, Claris CAD 2.0 and with FileMaker Pro in 1991. The system proved popular and became a major selling point for Claris products, which were otherwise considered somewhat "low end". The system was soon used by a number of other products as well, and became fairly common during the early 1990s.

In 1992 Claris gave the system to Apple, who eventually re-branded it as a basic part of the Mac OS known as the Translation Manager. They also added Macintosh Easy Open which offered to open unknown documents using software installed on the machine and converting it using XTND. A developer's guide, XTND Programmer's Guide, was published in 1991 along with the XTND Developer's Kit 1.3, which was placed on their FTP site. XTND broke on the Power Macs, but an extension-to-the-extension released in 1993 fixed that for a time. By the 1995/96 time frame it appears Apple had already abandoned the entire system.

XTND consisted of a simple runtime engine that listed, loaded and managed a series of "translators". The translators were stored in resource files placed in the Mac's System folder, allowing them to be found and used by any program supporting the XTND system. Almost all of the actual logic was located in the translators, the runtime simply handed off filenames and parameters to code stored inside.

Claris supplied translators for word-processors like MacWrite, Microsoft Word, AppleWorks, AppleWorks GS, WriteNow, WordPerfect, WordStar, as well as translators for various spreadsheets, graphics and databases formats.

A major technical problem with XTND was that the conversion process was "opaque". The system ran code in the translators which had no way to provide feedback to the user or ask questions. This made it difficult to distinguish if a long conversion was still processing or if the process locked. Program freezes were a common occurrence as the code base aged. The converters themselves varied widely in quality. For example, the Microsoft Word extension was particularly prone to errors.
