= Lasso (programming language) =

Cross-platform software created in 1995

- Paradigm: Multi-paradigm: structured object-oriented (multi-dis), imperative: procedural, concurrent, exp-oriented, Meta: reflective
- Designed by: Kyle Jessup
- Developer: LassoSoft Inc.
- First appeared: 1995; 30 years ago
- Stable release: 9.3.1 / October 23, 2015; 9 years ago
- Typing discipline: Dynamic with constraints (strict-hybrid), nominative, duck (hybrid)
- Implementation language: C, Lasso
- Platform: Cross-platform
- OS: (OS X, Windows, Linux)
- License: Proprietary
- Filename extensions: .lasso, .LassoApp
- Website: www.lassosoft.com

Major implementations
- Lasso 8, Lasso 9

Influenced by
- Dylan, Smalltalk, Scala

Lasso is an application server and server management interface designed to develop internet applications. It is also a general-purpose, high-level programming language. Originally a web datasource connection tool for Filemaker and later included in Apple Computer's FileMaker 4.0 and Claris Homepage as CDML, it has since evolved into a complex language used to develop and serve large-scale internet applications and web pages.

Lasso includes a simple template system allowing code to control generation of HTML and other content types. Lasso is an object-oriented programming language in which every value is an object. It also supports procedural programming through unbound methods. The language uses traits and multiple dispatch extensively.

Lasso has a dynamic type system, where objects can be loaded and augmented at runtime, automatic memory management, a comprehensive standard library, and three compiling methodologies: dynamic (comparable to PHP-Python), just-in-time compilation (comparable to Java or .NET Framework), and pre-compiled (comparable to C). Lasso also supports Query Expressions, allowing elements within arrays and other types of sequences to be iterated, filtered, and manipulated using a natural language syntax similar to SQL. Lasso includes full Unicode character support in the standard string object, allowing it to serve and support multi-byte characters such as Japanese and Swedish, and supports transparent UTF-8 conversion when writing string data to the network or file system.

Lasso is often used as a scripting language, and also used in a wide range of non-scripting contexts. Lasso code can be packaged into standalone executable programs called "LassoApps", in which folder structures are compiled into single files.

The Lasso Server application server runs as a system service and receives requests from the web server through FastCGI. It then hands the request off to the appropriate Lasso Instance, which formulates the response. Multiple individual instances are supported, allowing one server to handle multiple sites, each as separate processes. The server uses a high performance IO-based green threading system designed for multi-core systems.

Lasso can be compared to the server-side scripting languages PHP and Python, ColdFusion, Ruby, etc.

== History ==
Lasso began in the mid-1990s when early web developers were attempting to build database-backed websites using Apple's FileMaker Pro. On the Mac platform, there were two solutions: Eric Bickford's WEB-FM, and Russell Owens' FileMaker CGI (ROFM) - both built in AppleScript and requiring the use of FileMaker Pro calculation fields for formatting. (WEB-FM was subsequently rewritten in C).

In the fall of 1995, independent developer Vince Bonfanti wrote a new CGI based on ROFM, using C/C++ for improved performance, and using the notion of HTML-based "templates" instead of relying on calculation fields. This proved very popular in the FileMaker community, and was brought to the attention of Bill Doerrfeld, owner of Blue World Communications Inc., a print and website development firm based out of Issaquah, Washington, who bought the source code.

At this time, Blue World experimented with improvements for the CGI in the Frontier scripting environment, which inspired the name "Lasso". Further need for improvement drove the creation of a C-based CGI which was later released as "Lasso 1.0". At this point Lasso only worked with FileMaker Pro 3.x and WebSTAR, and only ran on Apple Mac OS 8 and above.

Lasso's usage grew notably from reviews in print publications and Blue World's hosting of and participation in many email discussion lists, many of which specifically pertained to FileMaker Pro. Blue World also made frequent appearances and was known as a leading company at MacWorld conferences.

Following the release of the Lasso 1.2 lineup in January 1997, Blue World and the Bonfantis entered private talks with Claris, the software division of Apple Computer, and owner of FileMaker Pro. Claris eventually licensed the post-version-1.2 Lasso source code, and with the help of Vince and Paul Bonfanti released the FileMaker Web Companion as a component of FileMaker Pro 4.0. FileMaker Web Companion's language, CDML (Claris Dynamic Markup Language), differed from Lasso 1.2's LDML (Lasso Dynamic Markup Language), but was close enough as to offer an easy transition for developers looking to serve from FileMaker Pro through third-party servers and offered more compelling features.

Including the Lasso-like Web Companion in FileMaker 4.0 also stimulated growth of Lasso within the Macintosh web development community. Blue World continued developing Lasso with Kyle Jessup becoming Lasso's lead programmer. Lasso 2.0 was released in July 1997, introducing some fundamental shifts in how Lasso could be used.

On February 26, 2002, Blue World released Lasso 5, a radical departure from the FileMaker-centric language to date. (There was never a Lasso 4 release; the version number skipped from 3 to 5.) Lasso 5 included, among many updates, a completely rewritten architecture (for OS X, Windows, Linux), and an embedded MySQL database. Though Lasso 5 still spoke to a FileMaker database (but not to a FileMaker Server), FileMaker as a data source remained relatively slow compared to an SQL engine, and was prohibitively more expensive. Since v2.0, Lasso was fully multithreaded, allowing many connections at once, but succumbed to FileMaker's latency or lag in certain operations, and there was no way to get around it reliably other than to make major changes to the data source.

Lasso 5 also added support for Apache HTTP Server natively under OS X, Windows, and Linux, joining Webstar 5, AppleShare IP (which was replaced by OS X Server), and iTools (from Tenon). (Mac OS 9, on which Lasso had been used for many years, was unsupported). This drove closer ties to a classic LAMP server architecture.

Blue World Communications released a series of plug-ins for popular Web development packages from Macromedia and Adobe. Lasso Studio 1.5 for Dreamweaver was a runner-up in MacWorld magazine's Editors' Choice Awards for Internet and Development in 2001, losing out to Adobe Dreamweaver 3. Lasso Studio for Dreamweaver 1.5 was also reviewed favorably by MacWorld magazine, earning 4 1/2 mice. Later version of Lasso Studio supported both Macromedia Dreamweaver and Adobe GoLive including Lasso Studio 7 for Dreamweaver and GoLive on March 26, 2004.

With the release of FileMaker Server and FileMaker Server Advanced version 7 in 2004 FileMaker signaled a major change in their strategy for serving data to Web sites. They emphasized XML-XSLT, ODBC, and JDBC connectivity, but only through the more expensive FileMaker Server Advanced product. Blue World began to distance the Lasso language from FileMaker and Apple. In 2005, Lasso Pro received MySQL Network certification demonstrating the importance of the popular open source database to the future of Lasso.

On August 1 of 2004, Bill Doerrfeld officially sold the Lasso product line to OmniPilot Software, Inc. in Ft. Lauderdale, Florida. Lasso 7.0.3 was the last version of Lasso released by Blue World.

On October 25, 2004, OmniPilot officially announced the release of Lasso 8, a version including sandboxing for multiple sites on the same server and connectivity to many new datasources. This also included the first "free" version of Lasso limited to IP addresses. OmniPilot followed this release with a number of complementary products, including Lasso Studio 8 for Dreamweaver and GoLive on March 28, 2005, Lasso Studio for Eclipse, ChartFX integration and a number of free Lasso-based solutions.

In 2007, three OmniPilot employees, Kyle Jessup (the original developer of Lasso 1.0), Fletcher Sandbeck (an early employee of Blue World known for regular Tips and Tricks) and Kerry Adams (an employee of OmniPilot) created a new company, LassoSoft LLC, to purchase the intellectual property of Lasso from OmniPilot and continue development. Recognizing the need to be competitive against much more popular languages such as PHP and ASP, radical changes in architecture, syntax and structure were made and released as Lasso 9.0. Technical challenges caused by these changes, coupled with limited marketing resources, led to significant community decline as the company struggled to release documentation and support for the new language.

In December 2010 a new Canadian company LassoSoft Inc. was formed, which bought and invested heavily in the Lasso 9.0 language, marketing and documentation. Kyle Jessup agreed to stay on as both Lasso's Lead Developer and Benevolent Dictator for Life. Several releases (9.1 and 9.2) have released further developments in recent years.

=== Release history ===
Key
Color	Meaning	Development
Red	Old release	No development
Yellow	Stable release	Security fixes
Green	Stable release	Bug and security fixes
Blue	Future release	New features

Version	Release date	Notes
ROFM	>1994-03-14	Russell Owens' FileMaker CGI, early AppleScript-based connector for FileMaker Pro databases
0.1	Sep-1995	CGI connector written by Vince Bonafonti in C/C++ to connect FileMaker Pro to the web
1.0	27-Sep-1996	Connector for FileMaker Pro 3.x and WebSTAR
1.1	Dec-1996	WebSTAR plug-in, client browser information, complete GUI security layer
1.2	Jan-1997	Source code licensed to Claris (Apple Computer Inc), named CDML, installed in Claris Homepage
2	17-Jul-1997	Included mathematical calculations, variables, complex data types, server side includes, client header information, advanced conditional statements, a Java-client interface, Apple Events control for other applications on the web server, multiple database actions, and Instant Web Publishing
2.5	1-Dec-1997	Added tag standardization and interoperability, ability to communicate with the WebTen web server (a port of Apache HTTP Server to the Mac OS by Tenon Intersystems)
3.0	07-Oct-1998	Added data validation filters, macros, file/directory management, date/time controls, list variables, multiple named tokens, robust error handling, MIME email, email attachments, extended math routines, enhanced string functions, enhanced encoding controls
3.5	14-Apr-1999	Added WYSIWYG authoring using Macromedia Dreamweaver 2 and Adobe GoLive 4, multithreading, LJAPI, optional HTTP server, support for Netscape server, JavaScript, XML and advanced tag parser with built-in debug controls
3.6	5-Jan-2000	Support for FileMaker 5 Data Sources, SQL wizard for interactive SQL queries, customizable global error pages and Studio for MacroMedia DreamWeaver
3.6.5	1-Oct-2000	Added connector for MySQL, Red Hat and OS X support
5	26-Feb-2002	Rewritten architecture for OS X, Windows, Linux, with embedded MySQL; added sessions, file manipulation, native connector for Apache, and LassoScript (adding "scripting" methodology to the language)
6	17-Sep-2002	Added imaging, PDF manipulation, native XML, FTP integration, date math, durations
7	30-Aug-2004	MySQL externalized (due to licensing), FileMaker closed connector
7.1	13-Sept-2004	Added compatibility with Filemaker Pro 7
8	25-Oct-2004	Lasso Server broken down into separate "sites" for hosting providers
8.1	19-Sep-2005	Added document caching, stability fixes
8.5	9-Jun-2006	Added full AJAX integration, multiple data source connectors pre-installed for FileMaker, FileMaker Server Advanced, MySQL, SQLite, MS SQL Server, Sybase, Oracle, PostgreSQL, OpenBase, ODBC, and Apple's Spotlight engine
9	29-Jan-2010	Major architectural change: more syntax, strong-typing vs. weak-typing, JIT compiling, native serializing, 64-bit support
8.6	20-Apr-2011	Speed, stability increased
9.1	11-Jul-2011	New administration interface, 64-bit connector, new SAS licensing
9.2	1-Jun-2012	Windows support added, integrated debugging, integrated code profiling
9.3	23-Jan-2015	New admin interface, new compilation methodology, centralized server deployment

== Code examples ==
=== Hello World ===
Here are three ways to say "Hello world!" on a Lasso page.

<?lasso 'Hello World!' ?>

['Hello world!']

Hello world!

Square brackets are reserved in Lasso, so HTML entities must be used to show square brackets on Lasso pages for other purposes than marking Lasso tags. Alternatively, printing square brackets can be by Lasso or be disabled by including [no_square_brackets] at the file top.

=== Inlines ===
// Find all records in a table
inline(		
	-database='db_name', 
	-table='table_name', 
	-findall	
) => {
	// Iterate through and process each row
	rows => {	
		// Output each row to the current web request
		content_body += '<a href="' + column('url') + '">' + column('title') + '</a>'
	}	
}

Inlines are the basic Lasso tool for database actions. Database commands can be issued as above, in Lasso's db-independent metalanguage, in which case the same search code works for MySQL, FileMaker Pro or for any other database backend with which Lasso can connect.

If needed, a SQL statement can of course be embedded in the inline when using a database server that supports SQL:

 // Execute SQL statement
 inline(		
 	-database='db_name', 
 	-sql = 'SELECT * FROM table_name'	
 )...

In the above example, the dashes (-) before commands denote optional parameters. These can be specified in any order and generated dynamically; the last of any duplicate parameters take precedence. The inline command supports a large range of parameters allowing developers to interact with databases that they may not have intimate knowledge of.

Custom database connectors can be created which allows leveraging the abstracted nature of the inline command.

=== 99 Bottles of Beer ===
The next procedural example prints out the lyrics for the song "99 Bottles of Beer".

// Define a couple of useful methods

	define br => '<br/>'
	define bottles(n::integer) => #n != 1 ? ' bottles' | ' bottle'

// Declare the local that will store the lyrics as a string

	local(out = '')

// Use Lasso query syntax to generate the lyric

	with n in 99 to 1 by -1 do {

		#out +=  #n + bottles(#n) + ' of beer on the wall, ' + br
		#out +=  #n + bottles(#n) + ' of beer; ' + br
		#n--
		#out += 'Take one down, pass it around, ' + br
		#out += #n + bottles(#n) + ' of beer on the wall. ' + (br * 2)
	}

// Output result

	#out

The next example uses an OOP approach to print out the lyrics when the object is represented as a string:

// Define type
define bottles_of_beer => type {

	// Define internal data 
	data private bottles = 99

	// Define private methods
	private br => '<br/>'
	private s => .bottles != 1 ? 's' | ''
	
	// Generate lyrics when object represented as a string
	public asstring => {

		local(out = '')
	
		// Use Lasso query syntax to generate the lyrics
	

		with n in 99 to 1 by -1 do {
			.bottles = #n
			#out +=  .bottles + ' bottle' + .s + ' of beer on the wall, ' + .br
			#out +=  .bottles + ' bottle' + .s + ' of beer; ' + .br
			.bottles--
			#out += 'Take one down, pass it around, ' + .br
			#out += .bottles + ' bottle' + .s + ' of beer on the wall. ' + (.br * 2) 
		}

		// Return result
		return #out
	}
}

bottles_of_beer

== Development tools, environments ==
- LassoLab
- Lasso Studio for Eclipse
- Lasso language mode for Coda
- Lasso language module for BBEdit
