= Beagle Bros =

American software company

Beagle Bros Micro Software, Inc.
- Type: Private
- Industry: Software
- Founded: October 1, 1980
- Founder: Bert Kersey
- Defunct: 1991
- Headquarters: San Diego, California, U.S.
- Key people: Bert Kersey, Alan Bird, Jack Cassidy, Mark Simonsen, Rob Renstrom, Randy Brandt, Dan Verkade, Matt Reimer, Mark Munz

Beagle Bros was an American software company that specialized in creating personal computing products. Their primary focus was on the Apple II family of computers. Although they ceased business in 1991, owner Mark Simonsen permitted the Beagle Bros name and logo to be included on the 30th anniversary reboot of I. O. Silver, released on December 12, 2014, by former Beagle programmer Randy Brandt.

== History ==
Beagle Bros was founded in 1980 by Bert Kersey and expanded over the years to include a wide variety of staff members, programmers, and designers. Whereas most software companies focused on professional users and business systems, Kersey founded the company with the intention of capitalizing on the "hobbyist" market that had formed when affordable personal computers became more readily available. Apple Mechanic allowed users to create their own shape tables (an early form of sprites) to create their own games, DOS Boss let users patch the disk operating system, and Beagle Bag had a number of games written in BASIC that people could utilize. Beagle Bros' catalog and print advertisements featured many playful programming tips about the Apple II system, many in the form of short Applesoft BASIC programs that took advantage of undocumented or unexpected behavior. Beagle Bros used woodcut and other 19th century artwork in its printed designs.

Beagle Bros released content for the Apple IIGS platform. Platinum Paint and BeagleWrite GS (acquired and repackaged) are commercial IIGS software.

Beagle Bros began producing add-ons for AppleWorks, its first being the MacroWorks keyboard shortcut utility by Randy Brandt. Beagle Bros programmer Alan Bird later devised an API for creating AppleWorks add-ons, which they dubbed TimeOut. TimeOut programmers Alan Bird, Randy Brandt and Rob Renstrom were tapped by Claris to develop AppleWorks 3.0, and the TimeOut API itself became a part of AppleWorks with version 4.0. Eventually the TimeOut API was made public and a number of non-Beagle TimeOut applications were released.

In 1991, Mark Simonsen licensed the Beagle Bros Apple II line to Quality Computers. Quality Computers subsequently went through several acquisitions and no longer exists. Multiple Beagle Bros products were released as freeware in the mid-1990s, including most of the company's early utilities and games. Today, their programs are available on the Internet.

BeagleWorks, the company's main Macintosh product, was licensed to WordPerfect Corporation in 1992, where it became WordPerfect Works. This product was later discontinued after WordPerfect was acquired by Novell. The company also produced a few small Macintosh and PC utilities.

Many former employees have continued to be involved in the software industry, such as Joe Holt who co-authored iMovie, and Alan Bird who worked on Eudora and the OneClick shortcut utility for Macintosh. Randy Brandt created Online Army Knife, an award-winning Macintosh spell checker, and continued publishing AppleWorks products through his JEM Software spin-off. Mark Munz created Deja ][, which allows AppleWorks to run under Mac OS X. The company's founder, Bert Kersey, started a model train company after selling Beagle Bros, and is now retired.

== Software ==
Title	Author(s)	Published	Description
Apple Printer			Lo-res graphics and titling program
Alpha Plot	Bert Kersey and Jack Cassidy	1980	Hi-res graphics program
Apple Mechanic/Shape Mechanic	Bert Kersey	1982	Hi-res shape/font editor; multiple other utilities
Apple Mechanic Typefaces	Bert Kersey		Twenty-six fonts for use with Apple Mechanic
AppleWorks 3.0 Companion			Patches for various AppleWorks 3.0 modules
Beagle Bag	Bert Kersey and the Beagle Bros staff		A collection of games including Buzzword!, Elevators, Hang Person, Magic Pack, Oink!, Pick-A-Pair, Quick-Draw!, Slippery Digits, Sub Search, TextTrain, Triple Digits and Wowzo, plus the Beagle Menu utility
Beagle BASIC	Mark Simonsen	1983	An expanded version of Applesoft BASIC with various new commands
The Beagle Compiler	Alan Bird	1986	AppleSoft BASIC program compiler
BeagleDraw	Robert A. Hearn and Jeff G. Erickson	1989	Apple IIGS graphic application, formerly TopDraw
Beagle Graphics	Mark Simonsen		Graphics editor in 16-color double hi-res
Beagle Screens	Fred & Sara Crone, Matt Reimer, Bert Kersey and Robert Renstrom	1986	Full-screen captionable clip art
BeagleWorks		1992	Later renamed WordPerfect Works, then PerfectWorks
BeagleWrite, BeagleWrite GS	Kevin Harvey, Alex Perelberg and Mark Munz	1989	ProDOS-based GUI word processor, acquired from Styleware where it had been named MultiScribe
BeagleWrite Desk Accessories			Adds a clock, calendar and calculator
BeagleWrite Picture Manager			Allows import of Print Shop (8-bit) and Newsroom images
Big U	Randy Brandt	1986	ProDOS utilities including CRT.WRITER, FILE.MOVER and KEYCAT.80
D Code	Alan Bird		AppleSoft program optimizer and debugger
DiskQuik	Harry Bruce and Gene Hite		Creates a virtual disk in RAM
DOS Boss	Bert Kersey and Jack Cassidy		DOS 3.3 enhancer and command editor
Double-Take	Mark Simonsen		Various small utilities including two-way text scrolling
Extra K	Alan Bird and Mark Simonsen	1985	An extended memory utility allowing AppleSoft to use a second 64K bank of memory in an upgraded IIe or IIc
FatCat	Alan Bird		Disk library cataloguer
Flash	Joe Holt	1989	Tool to copy files over AppleTalk, integrated into the Finder. Beagle's first Macintosh program
Flex Text	Mark Simonsen	1982	Variable-width hi-res text utility
Font Mechanic	Mark & Jon Simonsen	1985	Thirty fonts for use with Shape Mechanic
Frame-Up	Tom Weishaar	1982	Apple presentation program
GPLE	Neil Konzen	1983	Global Program Line Editor for AppleSoft BASIC programs. Originally published by Synergistic Software, 1982.
GS Font Editor			Font editor for AppleWorks
I.O. Silver	Brad Wilhelmsen	1984	Popular strategy/action game rebooted in 2014 as a 30th anniversary mobile app
MacroWorks	Randy Brandt	1986	Macros (keyboard shortcuts)for AppleWorks 1.3
Master Find			Master Mind-style game
Minipix	Fred & Sara Crone		A three-disk series of clipart collections
Outliner	Randy Brandt	1990	AppleWorks 3.0 Word Processor outlining
Platinum Paint	Matt Reimer		Apple IIGS paint program
Point-to-Point	Gary Little	1988	Telecommunications program
Power Print	Robert Renstrom		Dot matrix printer utility
Pro-Byter		1985	Disk editor and ProDOS utilities
Program Writer	Alan Bird	1987	AppleSoft program editor
ProntoDOS	Tom Weishaar		Accelerated version of DOS 3.3 with other additional features
Resource Disk			Sample file disk for SuperFonts Activity Guide
Shape Mechanic	Bert Kersey and Mark Simonsen		Shape animation and screen fonts
Silicon Salad	Bert Kersey and Mark Simonsen		Various tips, tricks and utilities from Beagle Bros Tip Books 5, 6 and 7
Super MacroWorks	Randy Brandt	1986	Macros (keyboard shortcuts) for AppleWorks 2.0
TimeOut series			Various add-ons for AppleWorks 2.0 and newer built on the TimeOut core technology created by Alan Bird. Includes products detailed below, plus MacroEase, MacroTools, Paint, TeleComm and Utilities
TimeOut DeskTools	Howard Bangerter, Alan Bird, Glenn Clawson, Mark de Jong & Dan Verkade	1987	Calculator, Calendar, Case Converter, Clock, Data Converter, Dialer, Envelope Addresser, File Encrypter, Note Pad, Page Preview, Puzzle, Word Count
TimeOut DeskTools II	Dan Verkade, Glenn Clawson & Randy Brandt	1988	Area Codes, Calculator+, Clipboard Viewer, DirecTree, Disk Tester, File Search, Measurements, Printer Manager, Screen Out, Screen Printer, Stop Watches
TimeOut FileMaster	Randy Brandt	1987	File and disk utilities
TimeOut Grammar	Dan Verkade		Grammar checking for the AppleWorks Word Processor
TimeOut Graph	Robert Renstrom	1987	Graphing for the AppleWorks Spreadsheet
TimeOut MacroEase	Randy Brandt & Mark Munz	1990	Macro-related Timeout apps and sample macros
TimeOut MacroTools	Randy Brandt	1988	Macro-related Timeout apps and sample macros
TimeOut MacroTools II	Randy Brandt	1988	Macro-related Timeout apps and sample macros
TimeOut PowerPack	Randy Brandt	1988	ASCII Values, AWP to TXT, Category Search, Desktop Sorter, File Librarian, Help Screens, Line Sorter, Program Selector, Triple Clipboard, Triple Desktop
TimeOut QuickSpell	Alan Bird	1987	Spell checking for the AppleWorks Word Processor
TimeOut ReportWriter	Dan Verkade	1989	Relational reports for the Data Base and Spreadsheet
TimeOut SpreadTools	Alan Bird, Randy Brandt and Dan Verkade	1988	CelLink, Block Copy, Error Analyzer, Bird's Eye View, AutoZoom, Data Converter, Cross Reference, Formula/Value Switcher, Quick Widths, Row Column Converter
TimeOut SideSpread	Mark Simonsen	1987	Wide paper printing for the AppleWorks Spreadsheet
TimeOut SuperFonts	Mark Simonsen	1987	Graphical fonts for the AppleWorks Word Processor
TimeOut SuperForms	Dan Verkade		Form generation
TimeOut TextTools	Mark Munz, Randy Brandt and Howard Bangerter		assorted tools
TimeOut Thesaurus	Alan Bird		Synonyms in the AppleWorks Word Processor
TimeOut UltraMacros	Randy Brandt	1987	Keystroke recorder and macro programming language
Tip Disk#1	Bert Kersey		One hundred tips from the Beagle Bros Tip Books
Triple-Dump	Mark Simonsen and Robert Renstrom		"Print anything" utility for dot matrix printers
Utility City	Bert Kersey	1982	Twenty-one separate Apple utilities
Zoom Graphix			Sends hi-res images to any graphics-compatible printer
