= Randy Komisar =

American author and attorney

Randy Komisar is an American technology attorney, executive, and author living in Silicon Valley, California. Komisar is the co-founder of Claris, former CEO of Lucas Arts Entertainment, Chief Financial Officer of GO Corp, and the "virtual CEO" of TiVo.

== Early career ==
Komisar attended Brown University for undergraduate studies and received a J.D. from Harvard Law School. He practiced law in the Boston area until he managed the legal aspects of the acquisition of Pixar by Steve Jobs. Following the acquisition, he went to work for Apple, where he worked on the project to license the Macintosh operating systems to Apollo Computer. Following the refusal of the board to license the operating system, Komisar accepted a job to co-found Claris.

== Claris ==
Apple decided to spin software products off to a third party, creating Claris in 1987. Komisar was asked by Bill Campbell to become a co-founder of the company and ran a number of acquisitions. While at Claris, Komisar negotiated deals with Filemaker, which the company would morph into over time, but failed to negotiate an attempt to acquire Quark.

Claris would later announce intentions to go public. Apple declined the option for Claris to file for an initial public offering, leading to each executive selling their shares.

== Chief Executive and Venture Capital ==
Komisar would go on to work with a number of notable technology startups:

- Komisar served on the Board of Directors of WebTV prior to the 1995 acquisition by Microsoft
- CFO of GO Corp
- CEO of LucasArts Entertainment
- CEO of Crystal Dynamics
- Originally intending to create a home network device, TiVo would digitize video on a set top box for a monthly service at the suggestion of [Randy Komisar] and make him a founding director.
- Komisar would serve as "virtual CEO of GlobalGiving
- Early-stage investment advisor at Kleiner Perkins (since 2005)
- Serves on the board and advises Gusto, Motiv, Veem, Nav
- Served on the board and advised Graphiq until they were acquired by Amazon
- Served on the board and advised Google Nest until they were acquired by Google
- Served on the board and advised RPX Corporation until they were acquired by HGGC

== Author ==
Komisar has written a number of books about entrepreneurialism and venture capital:

- The Monk and the Riddle
- Getting to Plan B
- I F*cking Love That Company
- Straight Talk for Startups

== Non-Profit Work ==
- Roadtrip Nation Advisory Board
- Orrick's Women's Leadership Board
