= MWP =

MWP or MWp may refer to:

== Politics ==
- Member of the Welsh Parliament (or Senedd), Wales
- Modern Whig Party, see Whig Party (United States) § Namesakes

== Science and technology ==
- Medieval Warm Period, a North Atlantic climatic event
- Megawatt peak, a solar panel's nominal power
- Mwp (moment magnitude WP), a seismic scale
- MacWrite Pro, a word processor
