= Robert Lafore =

American computer programmer

Robert W. Lafore (born March 11, 1938) is a computer programmer, systems analyst and entrepreneur. He is credited with coining the term "interactive fiction" and was an early software developer in the field.

== Career ==
Lafore worked as a systems analyst for the Lawrence Berkeley National Laboratory.At one time he was an editor for the Waite Group publishers.. In the early days of microcomputing, he wrote programs in BASIC for the TRS-80 and founded his own software company.

Lafore wrote a number of text adventure games for Adventure International; Nick Montfort credits him with coining the term "interactive fiction" for these works.

Lafore has authored a number of books on the subject of computer programming, including Soul of CP/M. and Assembly Language Primer for the IBM PC and XT. Later books included C++ Interactive Course, Object-Oriented Programming in C++, Turbo C Programming for the IBM, and C Programming Using Turbo C++.
