= Applesoft =

Applesoft is a name used by Apple Inc. for:

- Applesoft BASIC, a programming language interpreter built into Apple II computers
- the division responsible for developing the classic Mac OS from 1993 until about 1997
