= Bento (database) =

Database application

- The Bento public preview running on Leopard
- Developer: FileMaker Inc.
- Stable release: 4.1.2 / October 1, 2012; 13 years ago
- Operating system: macOS, iOS
- Type: Database software
- License: Commercial and proprietary
- Website: www.filemaker.com/products/bento/overview.html

Bento is a discontinued database application for Mac OS X made by the former FileMaker Inc., since renamed to Claris. Bento differed significantly from the company's flagship product, FileMaker Pro, in that it relied heavily on templates and integration with other applications. By default, Bento's data sources included Apple's Address Book and Calendar (previously called iCal) applications, which it could modify directly. FileMaker announced on July 31, 2013, that it would discontinue Bento on September 30, 2013.

== Compatibility ==
Bento was only compatible with Mac OS X 10.5 or later due to its reliance on features not available in previous versions of the operating system. Certain actions, such as switching templates, used Core Animation to animate the transition. It also included integration with Time Machine for backing up and required iCal 3.0 (later renamed Calendar) for live data editing.

== Release schedule ==
A public preview was made available alongside the initial product announcement on November 13, 2007, with the first final version released on January 8, 2008.

== Version history ==
Bento Releases
| Date | Version |
|---|---|
| Nov 13 2007 | Bento Public Preview |
| Jan 8, 2008 | Bento v1 |
| Oct 14, 2008 | Bento v2 |
| Sep 29, 2009 | Bento v3 |
| Mar 16, 2011 | Bento v4 |

== Template sharing ==
A Bento template was a pre-made library with all the forms necessary to catalog items within a certain context. With the release of Bento 2 on October 14, 2008, Bento users could import, export and share their templates. On June 16, 2009, FileMaker launched its own template-sharing site where users could download a variety of templates as well as share their own.

== Upgrade controversy ==
On October 14, 2008, FileMaker released Bento 2.0 with bug fixes and new features, including integration with Apple's Mail. The new version did not offer upgrade pricing and cost the same as version 1. Many customers expressed their disappointment at the official Bento user forums, where FileMaker responded that they were using the "same pricing model" as other companies' products such as Apple's iWork and iLife suites.

Additionally, on November 25, FileMaker provided an official statement indicating that they would discontinue revisions and bug fixes for the version 1 product.

Given interest in a revision, this was neither a quick, nor an easy decision to come to.

Bento 1 received extensive beta testing, but like every software product, issues were discovered after shipment. We followed up with Bento 1.0.2 to address critical issues that had been discovered.

In addressing product issues discovered after 1.0.2 for the 2.0 release, we reworked the product in significant, and sometimes, architectural ways. Simply put, this means that there is no way to easily migrate the fixes in 2.0 backwards to 1.0. We would have to reengineer 1.0 until it effectively became 2.0. Doing so would have strongly delayed the 2.0.3 version of Bento, which we will be releasing as a free update for Bento 2.0.1/2.0.2 this week, and continued development of the Bento product line.

As of May 20, 2012, the price for Bento 4 was $49 for a single license, or $99 for a "Family Pack" of five licenses.

== Discontinuation ==
FileMaker announced on July 31, 2013, that it would completely discontinue the Bento product line on September 30, 2013, with technical support for Bento products finally ending on July 30, 2014.

== Competing software ==
=== FileMaker ===
- FileMaker Pro (formerly Claris FileMaker)

=== Others ===
- Alpha Five
- Dabitat
- Borland Paradox
- DataEase
- dBase
- Foxpro (later acquired by Microsoft)
- Helix Rade
- Kexi
- Tap Forms
- Lotus Approach
- Microsoft Access
- NeoOffice
- Omnis Studio
- OpenOffice.org Base
- SQLite
- Sun StarBase
- Sybase PowerBuilder
