= AppleWorks User Group =

Apple user group

The AppleWorks User Group is a group formed in 1991 to support users of Apple Inc's AppleWorks software suite. The group is often referred to as "AWUG". AWUG publishes a monthly newsletter, the AppleWorks Journal, that provides hints, tips, and techniques for AppleWorks. It also provides its members with telephone and email support, as well as access to a "Members Helping Members" database (actually distributed as a PDF) and the "AppleWorks News Service" website, which provides timely news and information about AppleWorks. Membership also includes access to the AWUG Public Domain Library, a repository of AppleWorks utilities, templates, fonts, enhancements, and updates. AWUG members also get discounts on various software titles. AWUG also supports developers of AppleWorks-related software.
