= AppleWorks =

Office software suite from Apple

- AppleWorks 6 for Mac OS X
- Developers: Apple II; Rupert Lissner; Macintosh; Bob Hearn; Scott Holdaway
- Release: 1984; 42 years ago

Final release(s)
- macOS: 6.2.9 / 14 January 2004
- Windows: 6.2.2 / 20 January 2004
- Operating system: Classic Mac OS, Mac OS X, Windows 2000 or later
- Successor: iWork
- Type: Office Suite
- License: Proprietary
- Website: AppleWorks at the Wayback Machine (archived February 3, 2007)

AppleWorks was an integrated office suite containing a word processor, database, and spreadsheet. It was developed by Rupert Lissner for Apple Computer, originally for the Apple II and launched in 1984. Many enhancements for AppleWorks were created, the most popular being the TimeOut series from Beagle Bros which extended the life of the Apple II version of AppleWorks. Appleworks was later reworked for the Macintosh platform.

AppleWorksGS was developed for the Apple IIGS using the graphical desktop interface instead of the text-based filecard interface of the Apple II. AppleWorksGS was slow and buggy; a planned version 2.0 never materialized. Beagle Bros created a BeagleWorks program that was eventually sold to the Apple subsidiary Claris. ClarisWorks for Macintosh (1991), and Windows (1993) became a popular program and saw rapid development. Those applications do not share any code with the 8-bit Apple II original.

Apple absorbed Claris and the name ClarisWorks was changed to AppleWorks. It was bundled with all consumer-level Macintoshes sold by Apple until its discontinuation. On August 15, 2007, after years of not being updated, Apple announced AppleWorks had reached end-of-life status, and would no longer be sold. Apple instead promoted its recently launched iWork suite as a replacement, which contains word processing, spreadsheet, and presentation applications with capabilities similar to AppleWorks, but is not directly compatible with AppleWorks file formats.

== History ==
=== AppleWorks (Apple II, 1984–1991) ===
Developed by Rupert Lissner, the original AppleWorks is one of the first integrated office suites for personal computers, featuring a word processor, spreadsheet, and database merged into a single program. It was released in 1984 as a demonstration product for the new 128K models of the Apple II line.

In 1982, Apple published Lissner's Quick File, a database program that closely resembled what would become the AppleWorks database module, on both the Apple III and Apple II. Apple favored Apple Pascal at the time, so Lissner initially wrote Quick File in that language at Apple's request. Lissner preferred coding in assembly language, however, and soon rewrote Quick File in assembly on his Apple III and, by summer of 1983, he had added word processor and spreadsheet modules as well. Apple initially purchased the rights to distribute both the Apple III and Apple II versions of the program. However, Apple decided to drop support for the Apple III and sold the rights for the Apple III version to Haba Systems, who marketed it as III E-Z Pieces and released it shortly before Apple released AppleWorks. The two products shared the same file formats.

All three AppleWorks programs have the same user interface and exchange data through a common clipboard. Previous Apple II application programs had mainly been designed with the older II/II+ line in mind, having only 48K of RAM and 40-column text (in the absence of an add-on card), thus limiting the software's capabilities. In contrast, Appleworks was designed for the IIe and IIc models which have more RAM, standard 80-column text, an optional numeric keypad, cursor keys, and the new ProDOS operating system in place of DOS 3.3 which had been standard on 48K machines.

AppleWorks debuted at #2 on Softalk's monthly bestseller list and quickly became the best-selling software package on any computer, ousting even Lotus 1-2-3 from the top of the industry-wide sales charts. Apple released version 2.0 in 1986 with the Apple IIGS, by which time Lissner was working on what became Microsoft Works. Apple's software subsidiary Claris sold the one millionth copy of AppleWorks in December 1988.

A substantial market for AppleWorks third-party accessories and support appeared. The September 1986 issue of inCider contained two AppleWorks-related articles; advertisements for two AppleWorks-related expansion cards from Applied Engineering, an application promising to let AppleWorks run on an Apple II Plus with an 80-column display board, an AppleWorks-dedicated newsletter called The Main Menu, and an AppleWorks-related product from Beagle Bros; many other advertisements that mentioned AppleWorks; and a column criticizing companies that developed AppleWorks-related products instead of new ones ("thinks small and innovates nothing"). Two years later Beagle Bros released the TimeOut series for AppleWorks and grossed millions of dollars. Thanks to the UltraMacros programming language they included, many other third-party developers innovated new products that used AppleWorks as a foundation and virtual operating system. Compute!'s Apple Applications reported in 1987 that "AppleWorks has become a frontier for software developers", and predicted that "Soon, the best software on the Apple II computer line will require AppleWorks". Claris contracted with Beagle Bros to upgrade AppleWorks to version 3.0 in 1989; TimeOut developers Alan Bird, Randy Brandt, and Rob Renstrom added new features and incorporated numerous TimeOut functions.

By 1989, Claris turned its attention to producing Macintosh and Windows software, letting AppleWorks languish. Claris did, however, agree to license the AppleWorks trademark to Quality Computers. TimeOut developers Randy Brandt and Dan Verkade then created AppleWorks 4.0 in 1993 and AppleWorks 5.0 in 1994, published by Quality Computers along with training videos.

The original 8-bit AppleWorks (which included 16-bit memory management on the IIGS) is sometimes referred to as "AppleWorks Classic" to differentiate it from AppleWorks GS and the later product for Macintosh and Windows.

==== Version history ====
Version	Year	Notes
1.0	1984	First release.
1.1	1985	Fixed hardware bugs with printers and interface cards.
1.2	1985	More hardware compatibility improvements.
1.3	1986	Hardware support enhancements. Update cost $20.
2.0	September 1986	More features and better hardware support. Update cost $50.
2.1	September 1988	Bug fixes and hardware compatibility improvements. Released by Claris.
3.0	1989	More features. Update cost either $79 or $99.
4.0	November 1, 1993	More features. Released by Quality Computers.
4.01	Early November 1993	Bug fixes.
4.02		Bug fixes.
4.3	1993	
5.0	November 1994	Code-named 'Narnia'.
5.1	Summer 1995	Bug fixes.

=== AppleWorks GS (Apple IIGS, 1988–1996) ===
Observers had expected AppleWorks 2.0 to have a Macintosh-like mouse-driven graphical user interface, but inCider reported before its release that such a revision had been delayed because of "problems between Apple and [Lissner]". It was nonetheless very popular among IIGS owners; in December 1987 Compute!'s Apple Applications reported that "the hottest product on the Apple IIGS is AppleWorks. No mouse interface, no color, no graphics. Just AppleWorks from the IIe and IIc world". The magazine wondered in an editorial, "AppleWorks, Where Are You?", stating that a IIGS version of AppleWorks or another AppleWorks-like integrated suite "could galvanize the machine's sales" and warned that otherwise "the IIGS may well languish".

In 1988, Claris acquired an integrated package called GS Works from StyleWare and renamed it AppleWorks GS, bringing the AppleWorks brand to the 16-bit Apple IIGS, though no code from the 8-bit Apple II version is used. In addition to the word processing, database, and spreadsheet functions, AppleWorks GS also includes telecommunications, page layout and graphics modules. Only one major version of AppleWorks GS exists, progressing as far as 1.1; a vaporware 2.0 update was rumored to be "just short of completion" for a long time. AppleWorks GS can open AppleWorks files without needing to import them first.

==== GS version history ====
Version	Year	Notes
1.0	1988	First version
1.0v2		Bug fix release.
1.1	1989	Supports System Software 5.
1.2	Not released	Planned bug fix release, developed by Quality Computers.
2.0	Not released	Planned release, developed by Quality Computers.

=== AppleWorks and ClarisWorks (Macintosh and Windows, 1991–2004) ===
The second incarnation of AppleWorks began as ClarisWorks, written by Bob Hearn and Scott Holdaway and published by Claris, a wholly owned subsidiary of Apple, also known as FileMaker Inc.) The Creator code of ClarisWorks for the Macintosh is "BOBO". ClarisWorks combines these applications:

- A word processor, which in version 6 also includes an equation editor based on MathType.
- A drawing program,
- A painting program,
- A spreadsheet,
- A database program, and
- A terminal program for communications (up to and including version 5), or
- A presentation program (in version 6).

All the components are integrated so that, for example, spreadsheet frames can be embedded in a word processing document, or formatted text into drawings. The components are not derived from the contemporary Claris programs MacWrite and MacDraw.

ClarisWorks 1.0 shipped for the Macintosh in October 1991.

ClarisWorks 2.0 was released on March 24, 1993.

ClarisWorks 3.0 was released in October 1994. It is the last version to run on the 68000 CPU with at least System 6.0.7.

ClarisWorks 4.0 was released on June 14, 1995. It requires a 68020 CPU and System 7.

When the Claris company was disbanded and absorbed back into Apple, the product was renamed AppleWorks; version 5.0 was released on August 24, 1997, shortly before the product's return to Apple and was briefly called ClarisWorks 5. ClarisWorks/AppleWorks 5 requires System 7.0.1, though the 5.0.4 patch can only be applied in Mac OS 9. It is the last version to support the 68k CPU architecture.

The last major version, AppleWorks 6.0, released at MacWorld Expo in January 2000, requires a PowerPC CPU and replaces the communications module with a presentation module (in prior versions there was only rudimentary support for presentations through the other modules). It was also ported to the Carbon API to work on Mac OS X, but as an early Carbon application, it does not take advantage of many of the newer features of Mac OS X and portions of the interface still retain elements of the Platinum appearance of Mac OS 8/9.

Using Claris's XTND framework, AppleWorks can create, open, and save files in a number of file formats. For example, word processor documents can be saved in Microsoft Word format, and spreadsheet files can be saved in Microsoft Excel format.

The software received good reviews during the course of its lifespan for its interface and the tight integration of its modules. For example, like the earlier versions, in AppleWorks a drawing "frame" can be placed in a spreadsheet document, a paint frame can be placed in a drawing document, etc. This allows for very elaborate and data-rich layouts. However, the limitations of the product became more apparent as the product aged. The program also only allows for a single undo/redo, and in many cases, if a frame from one module is placed in another module, the frame may no longer be editable in any way as soon as it is deselected.

Equation Editor by Design Science is bundled with AppleWorks. Also, the MathType or MathMagic equation editors can be used. Both support automatic baseline alignment for inline equations.

=== Discontinuation ===
In August 2007, Apple declared AppleWorks "end of life" and stated that they would no longer sell the package. The iWork package, which includes a word processing program, a spreadsheet, and a presentation graphics program, is intended to be its replacement. While more feature-rich, iWork still lacks some of the modules and the tight integration of AppleWorks. AppleWorks will not run on any versions of Mac OS X later than Snow Leopard because it is compiled for the PowerPC CPU architecture.

AppleWorks word processing, spreadsheet, and presentation files can be opened in earlier versions of iWork applications Pages, Numbers, and Keynote respectively, but not since 2013. Collabora Online, LibreOffice, and Apache OpenOffice can open AppleWorks word processing, spreadsheet, and presentation files. A script exists for batch converting AppleWorks (.cwk) files to the Microsoft Word (.docx) format (usable by Pages) using the command-line interface for LibreOffice. There is no Apple-supplied application to open AppleWorks database, painting, or drawing files without converting them to a different format. EazyDraw Retro supports the import of the AppleWorks drawing formats. This software runs on Mojave and older. AppleWorks User Group continues support, and migrating away from AppleWorks is possible.

Several of the core engineers behind ClarisWorks left to form Gobe Software whose main product, GoBe Productive, would be released on BeOS, Windows, and Linux.

== Reception ==
II Computing listed AppleWorks ninth on the magazine's list of the top Apple II non-game, non-educational software as of late 1985, based on sales and market-share data.

BYTE's reviewer in December 1984 called AppleWorks "easy to use, genuinely user-friendly, and well documented". She called the word processor "my favorite part … well above average" and the spreadsheet and database "good but certainly not standouts". As a package for novice and casual users, the reviewer concluded, "Appleworks is excellent". InfoWorld that month disagreed, calling it "a study in limitations … this package is not strong". While approving of the shared clipboard and user interface, the magazine stated that Appleworks' limitations — such as the limit of eight pages in the word processor with 64K RAM — made it "not good enough as a business product to warrant much consideration".

Compute! in 1989 stated that "Though not a speed demon" like the original 8-bit AppleWorks, the GS version "isn't as slow as many had feared"; although a fast typist could still outrun the computer's display, it performed better than other Apple IIGS software. Although many original users bought the IIGS version, with reportedly 35,000 copies sold in the first three weeks, the magazine warned that they "must forget virtually everything they've learned … What a pain".

== See also ==
- List of office suites
- Comparison of office suites
