= Claris Home Page =

WYSIWYG HTML editor

- Claris Home Page running on Microsoft Windows
- Final release: 3.0 / January 1998; 28 years ago
- Operating system: Windows, Classic Mac OS
- Type: HTML editor

Claris Home Page was one of the earliest true WYSIWYG HTML editors, developed from 1994 on. The project was code-named Loma Prieta. Claris purchased it from San Andreas Systems, reworked it to use the user interface common to all their products, and released it in 1996.

== History ==
Home Page supported all the features common in HTML at the time. In January 1998, the third and final version of Home Page was released. This version contained templates and tools for building database-driven websites using FileMaker Pro 4.1 and Claris Dynamic Markup Language (CDML).

Within weeks of the final Home Page release, parent company Apple Computer reorganized Claris into FileMaker Inc., with Home Page and the FileMaker database as its only remaining products. Home Page was discontinued in 2001, though it continued to run in the Classic Environment of Mac OS X through version 10.4. The Home Page was designed for HTML 3.2, and consequently does not support HTML 4.0. Home Page cannot display Portable Network Graphics (PNG) images, and if it is used to upload them, the PNG files will be corrupted and rendered unviable.

Programmer Sam Schillace, who had developed Claris Home Page with his partner Steve Newman from 1994 on, would later go on to lead the development of Google Docs.
