= Amazing Animation =

Amazing Animation was a program published by Claris for the Apple Macintosh in 1994.

Amazing Animation was targeted mainly at children and young teenagers, enabling them to produce animated short films. The program featured pre-made backgrounds and sounds, and "actors" in the form of so-called "stamps". The stamps pictured various objects, such as a boy, a girl or a dolphin, and when dragged, these stamps would play a pre-programmed animation – the boy would walk, the dolphin swim, etc.

Users could also draw their own backgrounds, make their own stamps and record audio.

Included with the application was a special "player" application. This player application was free to copy, the idea being that when one wanted to distribute a movie (presumably by floppy disk, as this was before the days when files were regularly shared via the Internet), one would distribute the player application along with it. The player allowed people to watch the movie without having to buy the complete Amazing Animation package.

Amazing Animation was rated 3 out of 5 stars in a Macworld review.
