= Claris Organizer =

Personal information management computer program

Claris Organizer is a personal information management (PIM) computer program for the classic Mac OS that Claris acquired from a small company called Trio Development and sold during the 1990s. Trio Development was founded by James Harker, Jack Welde and Joseph Ansanelli, afterward joined by Seth Odam. It was sold to Palm when Claris was broken up, and was used as the basis for the Palm Desktop for Mac.
