= Hūsker Dū? =

Memory game

Hūsker Dū? (Note: In Danish – as in Norwegian – "Husker du?" (written without the macron above the u's) means "Do you remember?".) is a memory board game that can be played by children and adults, published in the United States in the 1950s. The game was more recently published in the United States by Winning Moves Games USA, but is not present in their 2026 catalog.

== Game play ==
The game board consists of a surface with holes in it, laid on top of a dial that contains several sets of small pictures. The holes are covered by markers at the start of the game, and the dial is rotated to line up one set of positions with the holes. On each turn, a player removes two markers to reveal the pictures underneath. If they do not match, the player replaces the markers and their turn ends. If the pictures do match, the player keeps the two markers and takes another turn. Once the board is cleared, the player holding the most markers is the winner.

== See also ==
- Hüsker Dü, a Minnesota alternative rock band whose name is derived from the game.
