= Claris CAD =

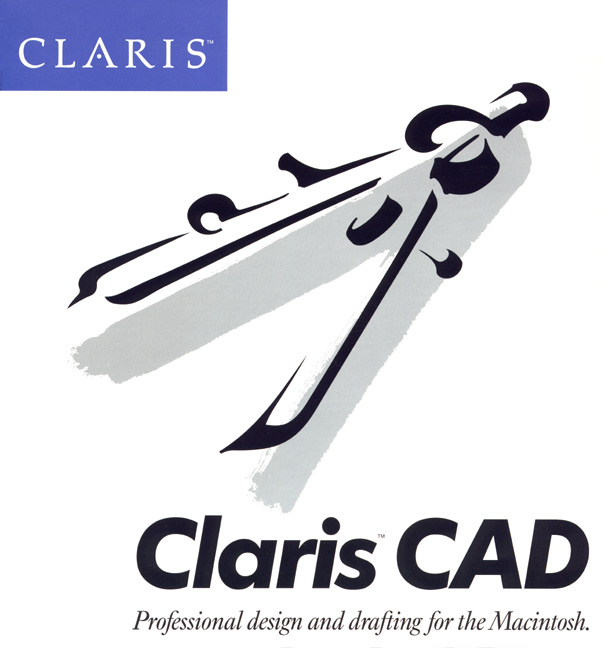
- Developer: Claris Corporation
- Final release: 2.0v3 / July 1991
- Operating system: Mac OS, System Software 6 or later
- Platform: Macintosh
- License: Proprietary

Claris CAD was a two-dimensional computer-aided design program for Apple Inc. Macintosh.

== History ==
Claris CAD was developed in 1988 by Claris Corporation in a joint effort with Craig S. Young of Computer Aided Systems for Engineering (CASE). It was based on MacDraw II and Young's earlier CAD application, EZ-Draft. Version 1 was released in 1989 for Macintosh computers running System Software 6 or later. The initial releases were plagued with bugs, especially with the bundled plotter driver. Development halted in June 1991 with the release of version 2.0.3. Currently, Claris CAD can be run on older Macintoshes using the "Classic" emulator included by Apple in Mac OS X 10.4.11 or older, or on current machines using the SheepShaver open-source "Classic" emulator (tested through Mac OS X 10.7).

== Features ==
Claris CAD uses a drawing system defined by Tools, Methods, and Modifiers. Tools draw objects, methods allow different ways of drawing with the tools, and modifiers help to position objects.

Some notable tool functions include: walls, arcs, chamfers, fillets, spline curves, perpendiculars, and tangents. Dimensioning tools can create point-to-point, chain, datum, angle, radius, diameter, and circle-center dimensions.

Predefined ANSI Y14.5, ISO, DIN, JIS, and BS-308 drawing standards templates are also included with the software.

A special Claris version of Microspot Ltd.'s MacPlot plotter driver was also part of the package, allowing Claris CAD to plot to Hewlett-Packard and Houston Instruments plotters. A utility called MacPlot Configure also lets the user specify a plotter model and assign pen colors to carousel positions.

The physical software package provides a reference, tutorial, and a videotape tutorial.

== Limitations ==
Though Claris CAD is sufficient for creating floor plans and manual orthographic projections, many users require three-dimensional capability. Most users have abandoned it because it can no longer run natively on modern machines. However, long-term users with numerous files in ClarisCAD format and limited 3D needs continue to use it by running the Sheepshaver "Classic" emulator on current Mac computers. Due to speed/memory increases of current hardware, performance under emulation is superior to native operation on older machines, and stability does not seem to have been compromised.

Among its other anomalies, the limited accuracy QuickDraw routines were not sufficient for direct use with highly accurate applications such as computer numerical control (CNC) machines.

Some versions of the program (including 2.0 v3) have a bug where users are unable to save their work, encountering an error stating that an additional 1k of disk space is required. This is due to a limitation of saving to large size, HFS+ formatted disks. One can save to a floppy disk or small RAM disk as a workaround, or use the "Save As..." command, renaming the file in the process.

== Interoperability ==
- Claris Graphics Translator by Claris Corp. converts drawings to IGES and AutoCAD DXF formats.
- Cadmover by Kandu Software translates drawings many formats, including IGES and DXF formats.
- PowerDraw Translator by Engineered Software converts drawings to DXF and EPSF/Illustrator formats.
- Three-dimensional modeling:
  - ModelShop by Paracomp
  - MacConcept by Klex Software
  - MacBRAVO! by Schlumberger
