= Mitchell Waite =

Computer book writer and publisher

Mitchell David Waite
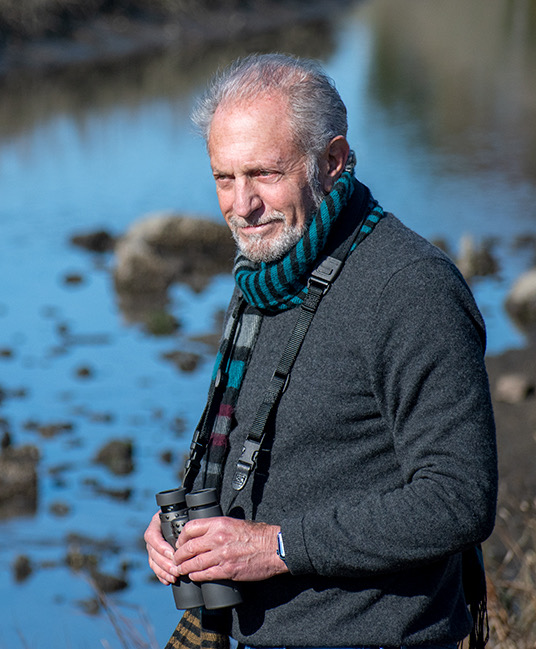
- Mitchell Waite in California
- Born: May 3, 1946 (age 80); San Francisco, CA
- Occupation: Publisher
- Known for: Programming books, iBird

Mitchell Waite is an American computer programmer, author and publisher of a number of bestselling programming books along with mobile apps. He was one of the first people to write popular books about electronics and micro-processor-based systems, with his books encouraging the "rapid development of the Mac platform in the 1980s."

== Life ==
Waite studied physical sciences and mathematics at the College of Marin in Kentfield, California from 1968 to 1971, and physics at Sonoma State University in the following years. During this time, he was fascinated with electronics and spent his spare time hunting for circuits and computer parts.

== Career ==
Waite's first book was Projects in Sight, Sound and Sensation, written with Michael Pardee and exploring various DIY electronic art projects. The book was published in 1974. During this time Waite worked as a technical writer for a telephone system. After writing two more books with Pardee in the following years, Waite decided to leave his job and write computer books full-time.

By 1977, he was earning $18,000 a year as a technical writer, an income that increased seven years later to a quarter of a million dollars.

in 1979, Waite published a computer graphics primer that became a bestseller. Six years later, he had written or collaborated on dozens of computer books.

Waite also created the website WhatBird and later developed iBird, a bird field guide app for iOS and Android.

== Apple Computers ==
While Waite never worked at Apple Computers, he was closely connected with people there. Waite met Steve Jobs at the Homebrew Computer Club in the 1970s. Jobs introduced the Apple I to the group and Waite was one of the first people to use the revolutionary computer, purchasing his at The Byte Shop in San Rafael. Because the early users of the Apple 1 were such a small community, Waite was able to interact directly with Jobs and Steve Wozniak and learn how the computer worked. These insights helped him launch his career as a computer author.

Jobs later found out about an elaborate weather station attached to the Apple I that Waite was running on his houseboat in Greenbrae, California and invited himself up to see it. When Jobs arrived he spent the entire time bragging about the new Apple II he had developed with Steve Wozniak. It was ten times better than the Apple I, he claimed, and invited Waite to come to Cupertino to see it. Jobs later offered Waite a job as Apple's head of documentation, but Waite turned it down because of the harsh 24/7 work environment. Jobs was evidently infuriated, called Waite a bozo and said he was blowing a once-in-a-lifetime opportunity.

Because of these connections, when the Macintosh 128K was released in 1984, Waite was in a "strategic position to introduce power users and programmers to the system," with the Waite Group publishing a series of titles on the computer.

== The Waite Group ==
Waite established the Waite Group in 1977, an organization of more than 20 computer authors based in San Rafael, California. The group has published more than 130 titles in the computer programming field and by 1984 was grossing $1.5 million in sales annually. In the late 1990s, the Waite Group was the first publisher to bundle access to real teachers with their instructional computer books.

The company was later sold to Simon & Schuster.

== Books ==
Books written by Mitchell Waite include:

- CP/M Bible
- Soul of CP/M
- MS-DOS Bible
- C Primer Plus
- BASIC Programming Primer
- Unix Primer Plus
- Pascal Primer
- BASIC Programming Primer for PC
- Bluebook of Assembly Language
- DOS Primer for PC
- Pascal Primer
- Assembly Language Primer for PC
- Turbo C++ Bible
- The Unix Papers
- C: Step by Step
- Supercharging C with Assembly Language
- Inside the 80286
- Framework from the Ground Up
- Master C: Let the PC Teach You C
- Object Oriented Programming in Turbo C++
- C++ Primer Plus
- Master C++: Let the PC Teach You C
- Visual Basic How To
- Windows API Bible
- Workout C
- Windows Programming Primer Plus
- Windows API Bible
- Object Oriented Programming in Microsoft C++
