= Claris =

Computer software development company

Claris International Inc.
- Type: Subsidiary
- Industry: Software
- Predecessor: FileMaker Inc.
- Founded: 1987; 39 years ago
- Founders: William Campbell; Randy Komisar; Yogen Dalal
- Headquarters: Cupertino
- Key people: Ryan McCann (CEO)
- Products: FileMaker
- Number of employees: 300
- Parent: Apple
- Website: claris.com

Claris International Inc., formerly FileMaker Inc., is a computer software development company formed as a subsidiary company of Apple Computer (now Apple) in 1987. It was given the source code and copyrights to several programs that were owned by Apple, notably MacWrite and MacPaint, in order to separate Apple's application software activities from its hardware and operating systems activities.

In 1998, the company divested itself of all but its flagship product, and reformed as FileMaker Inc. In 2019, FileMaker Inc. announced at DevCon that it was restoring the Claris brand name. Also in 2019, Claris acquired Italian startup, Stamplay, a cloud-based integration platform which connects web services like Dropbox and Slack without writing code, and announced they would rename their product offering as Claris Connect.

The company develops, supports and markets the relational database program FileMaker. The FileMaker Platform is available for the macOS, Microsoft Windows and iOS operating systems and is aimed towards business users and power users.

== History ==
First Claris logo

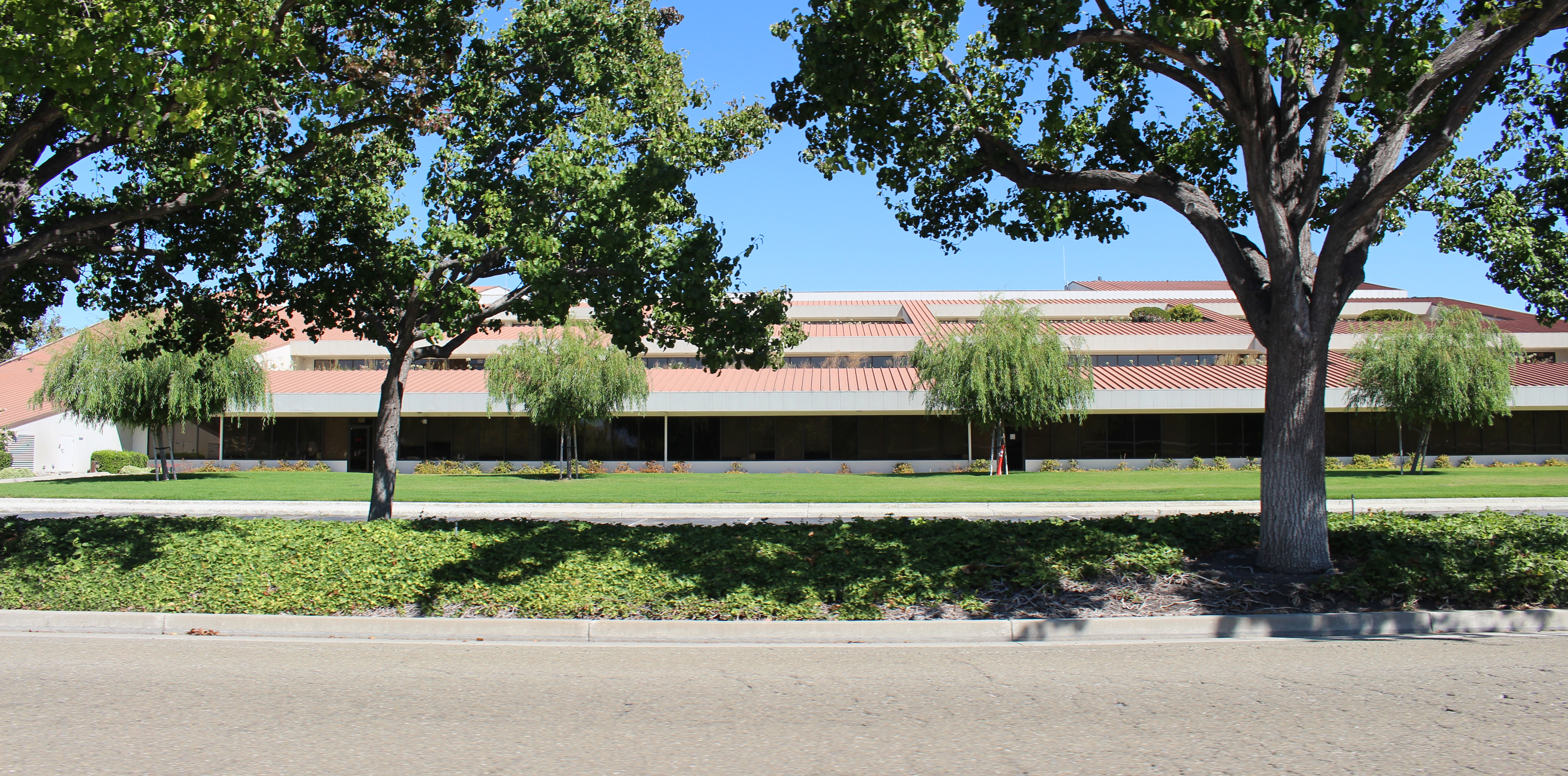
Former Claris headquarters ("The Wedge") in Santa Clara c. 2022

In the early days of the Mac, Apple shipped the machines with two basic programs, MacWrite and MacPaint, so that users would have a working machine "out of the box". However, this resulted in complaints from third-party developers, who felt that these programs were good enough for so many users that there was little reason to buy something better.

Apple decided to allow the programs to "wither" so that the third-party developers would have time to write suitable replacements. The developers did not seem to hold up their end of the bargain, and it was some time before truly capable replacements like WriteNow came along. In the meantime users complained about the lack of upgrades, while the third-party developers continued to complain about the possibility of upgrades.

Eventually Apple decided the only solution was to spin off the products to a third party of its own creation, forming Claris in 1987. Claris was also given the rights to several lesser-known Apple products such as MacProject, MacDraw, and the hit Apple II product AppleWorks. Claris' second corporate headquarters (nicknamed "The Wedge") was in Santa Clara, about six miles from the main Apple campus. The company began with five software products totaling about $50 million in revenue and access to Apple's distribution, acquisition, and marketing resources, with a goal of becoming fully independent in 18 months.

At first Claris provided only trivial upgrades, limited to making the products continue to run on newer versions of the Macintosh operating system. In 1988, Claris purchased FileMaker from Nashoba Systems and quickly released a rebranded version called FileMaker II, to conform to its naming scheme for other products, such as MacWrite II. The product, however, changed little from the last Nashoba version. Several minor versions followed; it was succeeded by FileMaker Pro 1.0 in 1990. In the meantime, development began on major overhauls of their entire product line, including FileMaker. Each of these would be eventually released as part of the Pro series of products.

In 1990, Apple decided that Claris should remain a wholly owned subsidiary, as opposed to being completely spun off in an initial public offering. The company president soon left, and over the next year most of the other executives followed.

That same year Claris also purchased an integrated application written by two former Claris employees. After rebranding in a style similar to FileMaker, MacDraw, and MacWrite, it was released in 1991 as ClarisWorks, and became another huge success for the company. After a lengthy series of ups and downs, this product was eventually taken back by Apple in 1998 and rebranded as AppleWorks (for Macintosh).

In September 1992, Claris released a cross-platform version of FileMaker for both the Mac and Windows; except for a few platform-specific functions, the program's features and user interface were the same. Up to this point FileMaker had no real relational capabilities; it was limited to automatically looking up and importing values from other files. It only had the ability to save a state—a filter and a sort, and a layout for the data. Version 3.0, released around 1995, introduced new relational and scripting features.

=== Transition to FileMaker Inc. ===
By the mid-1990s it appeared to most observers that Apple was in serious danger of disappearing. The main ClarisWorks development team left Claris, disillusioned with the product and the market, and founded Gobe Software, which produced a Claris-like office suite for BeOS.

Facing declining sales, Claris management decided that FileMaker was the only product worth keeping, and put all of the rest of the products on indefinite hold. By 1998 the transition was complete and the company renamed itself as FileMaker Inc. Claris's only other major product, ClarisWorks, was taken back by Apple to become AppleWorks. The company kept FileMaker and Claris HomePage 3.0. The latter was discontinued in 2001 leaving FileMaker as its lone offering until January 8, 2008, when the company released Bento, a template-based database application with a leaning toward information from other applications. Bento was discontinued on September 30, 2013.

=== Return to Claris ===
During DevCon 2019, the developers' conference, FileMaker announced it was resurrecting the Claris name and re-branding commenced. FileMaker Inc. changed its name to Claris International. The FileMaker product name remains as Claris FileMaker.

== Products ==
=== FileMaker ===
FileMaker is a cross-platform relational database application. It integrates a database engine with a graphical user interface (GUI) and security features, allowing users to modify the database by dragging new elements into layouts, screens, or forms. It started as an MS-DOS app called Nutshell, developed by Nashoba Systems.

=== Pro series ===
In the late 1980s, Claris began a major upgrade effort, rewriting all of its products to use a more modern and common user interface. The result was the "Pro" series: MacDraw Pro, MacWrite Pro, and FileMaker Pro. In order to provide a complete office suite they later purchased the rights to the Informix Wingz spreadsheet on the Mac, rebranding it as Claris Resolve, and added the new presentation program Claris Impact.

The series was released piecemeal over a period of about two years, during which period Microsoft was able to dominate the market with Microsoft Word and Microsoft Excel. While the Claris packages were arguably much more "approachable" than the Microsoft applications, the Claris software applications lacked some features of the now-mature Microsoft suite, leaving them lacking in "checkbox features." Their value was further eroded by aggressive bundling deals from Microsoft that could allow Word, Excel, and PowerPoint to be purchased for a cost not much higher than MacWrite alone—a bundle that Claris did not match. Claris did offer ClarisWorks, an all-in-one package; and, while the price was right, ClarisWorks was very limited and could not compete in the business market. Microsoft also released a Works package.

Microsoft's domination of the Macintosh office suite software marketplace would be replicated five years later when (following the release of Windows 95), Microsoft Office crushed its two main rivals in Windows software: the WordPerfect/Quattro Pro suite and the Lotus SmartSuite.

=== Other applications ===
By the late 1980s, HyperCard needed updating as well but Apple management did not see any value in the product and let it wither. Complaints eventually became loud enough that they decided something had to be done. Studying the problem, they decided that all software should be released through Claris, and sent HyperCard and the Mac OS to them. Many of the developers refused to move to Claris, leading to a serious split in development that delayed future releases of both products. The Mac OS was soon returned to Apple; HyperCard was ignored for a time, before also returning briefly as a part of the QuickTime group.

In 1988, Claris published Claris CAD, a 2-D CAD package, and Claris Graphics Translator, a translation package for Claris CAD.

In early 1989, Claris published Smart Form Designer, software to design forms, and a companion product, Smart Form Assistant, software to fill forms created by Smart Form Designer.

In 1994, Claris published Amazing Animation, software aimed at children and young teenagers, allowing them to produce their own short animated films.

In 1995, Claris purchased and released Claris Home Page, which enjoyed popularity as one of the few truly GUI-based WYSIWYG HTML editors of the time.

Other products added to the line included Claris Emailer; Claris Office Mail, which facilitated setup by non-specialists and Claris Organizer. These products were part of a new effort to diversify Claris and no longer chase the "office" market which, by this point, was considered a lost cause.

The Bento database product aimed at home users or small businesses was released in 2008 and discontinued in 2013.

== See also ==
- List of Mac software
- Clarus The Dogcow, a prolific icon in Macintosh / Claris software, such as seen in Page Setup configuration dialogs
