= FileMaker =

Database management system

- Developer: Claris
- Initial release: April 1985; 40 years ago
- Stable release: 22.0.4 ('FileMaker 2025') / November 2025; 4 months ago
- Operating system: Pro: macOS (26, 14.2.1, 13.6.3, 12.7.2); Windows (11, 10 Enterprise or Pro) x64; Go: iOS 16.7+; Server: macOS (26, 14.2.1, 13.6.3, 12.7.2); Windows Server (2022, 2019) Data Center and Standard Editions; Ubuntu 22.04 (ARM64, AMD64), 20.04
- Type: Database management system
- License: Proprietary
- Website: claris.com/filemaker

FileMaker is a cross-platform relational database application developed by Claris International, a subsidiary of Apple. It integrates a database engine with a graphical user interface (GUI) and security features, allowing users to visually modify a database. Versions for desktops, servers, iOS, and web-delivery have been released.

The desktop app is based on a DOS application originally named FileMaker, which was then developed primarily for the Apple Macintosh and released in April 1985. It was rebranded as FileMaker Pro in 1990. Since 1992 it has been available for Microsoft Windows and for the classic Mac OS and macOS, and has cross-platform capabilities.

FileMaker Go, the mobile app, was released for iOS devices in July 2010.

FileMaker Server allows centralized hosting of apps which can be used on both the desktop and mobile apps. A cloud variant, named FileMaker Cloud, is hosted by Claris.

== History ==
FileMaker began as an MS-DOS-based computer program named Nutshell, developed by Nashoba Systems of Concord, Massachusetts in the early 1980s. Nutshell was distributed by Leading Edge, an electronics marketing company that had recently started selling IBM PC-compatible computers.

With the introduction of the Macintosh, Nashoba combined the basic data engine with a new forms-based graphical user interface (GUI). Leading Edge was not interested in newer versions, preferring to remain a DOS-only vendor, and kept the Nutshell name. Nashoba found another distributor, Forethought Inc., and introduced the program on the Macintosh platform as FileMaker in April 1985. When Apple introduced the Macintosh Plus in 1986, the next version of FileMaker was named FileMaker Plus to reflect the new model's name.

Leading Edge published Nutshell 2.0 until September 1986, after which Nashoba marketed the software itself. In mid-1987 Forethought was purchased by Microsoft for the former's PowerPoint software. Microsoft expected to continue distributing FileMaker and deprioritize the competing Microsoft File, but Nashoba decided to self-publish the next version, FileMaker 4.

=== Purchase by Claris ===
Shortly after FileMaker 4's release, Apple Computer formed Claris, a wholly owned subsidiary, to market software. Claris purchased Nashoba to round out its software suite. By that point, Leading Edge and Nutshell had faded from the marketplace because of competition from other DOS- and later Windows-based database products. FileMaker continued to succeed on the Macintosh platform.

Claris changed the product's name to FileMaker II to conform to its naming scheme for other products, such as MacWrite II, but the product changed little from the last Nashoba version, with several minor versions following.

In 1990, the product was released as FileMaker Pro 1.0, and in September 1992, Claris released a cross-platform version for both the Mac and Windows. Except for a few platform-specific functions, the program's features and user interface remained the same.

By 1995, other than ClarisWorks, FileMaker Pro was the only well-performing product in Claris's lineup. In 1998, Apple moved development of some of the other Claris products in-house, dropped most of the rest, and changed Claris's name to FileMaker Inc., followed by a concentrated development of FileMaker alone.

In 2020, FileMaker International Inc. changed its name (back) to Claris International Inc. and announced the Claris Connect workflow software.

=== Later updates ===
Version 4.0, introduced in 1997, added a plug-in architecture much like that of Adobe Photoshop, which enabled third-party developers to add features to FileMaker. A bundled plug-in, the Web Companion, allowed the database to act as a web server. Other plug-ins added features to the interface and enabled FileMaker to serve as an FTP client, perform external file operations, and send messages to remote FileMaker files over the Internet or an intranet.

Version 5 introduced a new file format, which came with the file extension .fp5.

Version 7, released in 2004, introduced a new file format with the extension .fp7, supporting file sizes up to 8 terabytes (an increase from the 2 gigabytes allowed in previous versions). Individual fields could hold up to 4 gigabytes of binary data (container fields) or 2 gigabytes of 2-byte Unicode text per record (up from 64 kilobytes in previous versions). FileMaker's relational model was also expanded, offering multiple tables per file and a graphical relationship editor that displayed and allowed manipulation of related tables in a manner that resembled the entity-relationship diagram format. Accompanying these important changes, FileMaker Inc. also introduced a developer certification program.

In 2005 FileMaker Inc. announced the FileMaker 8 product family, which offered developers an expanded feature set. These included a tabbed interface, script variables, tooltips, enhanced debugging, custom menus, and the ability to copy and paste entire tables and field definitions, scripts, and script steps within and between files. Version 8.5, released in 2006, added an integrated web viewer (with the ability to view such things as shipment tracking information from FedEx and Wikipedia entries) and named layout objects.

FileMaker 9, released on July 10, 2007, introduced a quick-start screen, conditional formatting, fluid layout auto-resizing, hyperlinked pointers into databases, and external SQL links. FileMaker 10 was released on January 5, 2009, before that year's Macworld Conference & Expo, and offered scripts that can be triggered by user actions and a redesigned user interface similar to that of Mac OS X Leopard (10.5) applications.

FileMaker 11, released on March 9, 2010, introduced charting, which was further streamlined in FileMaker 12, released April 4, 2012. That version also added themes, more database templates (so-called 'starter solutions') and simplified creation of iOS databases. FileMaker Go 11 (July 20, 2010) and FileMaker Go 12 for iPhone and iPad (April 4, 2012) allowed only the creation, modification, and deletion of records on these handheld devices, whereas design and schema changes had to be made within the full FileMaker Pro application. FileMaker Go 12 brought with it multitasking, improved media integration, export of data to multiple formats and enhanced container fields.

FileMaker 13, released after the launches of iOS 7 and OS X Mavericks (10.9), first shipped in December 2013. The client and server products were enhanced to support more mobile and web methods of data access. FileMaker Go 13, the parallel iPad–iPhone product, became a single client for both devices, and the Server Admin tool now ran in HTML5, no longer requiring a Java app.

The FileMaker 14 platform released on May 15, 2015. It included FileMaker Pro 14, FileMaker Pro 14 Advanced, FileMaker Server 14 and FileMaker Go 14. This was followed by version 15 in May 2016 and version 16 in May 2017; both including equivalent Pro, Pro Advanced, Server and Go versions.

In late 2016, FileMaker began annually publicizing a software roadmap of incoming features already being worked on, as well as identifying features they are moving away from or may deprecate in the near future.

FileMaker Inc. had always had a hard time describing what FileMaker software was, because it covered a plethora of ground unrelated to databases; user interface, security, rapid application development tools, etc. At their annual developers conference in August 2018, FileMaker Inc. initiated a new marketing program called "Workplace Innovation Platform" to address the problem of its self-described software category.

=== FileMaker Cloud ===
On September 27, 2016, FileMaker Cloud was introduced, including a Linux server (CentOS), which was offered exclusively through the Amazon Marketplace. In November 2019, FileMaker Cloud was reintroduced as a software as a service product offered directly from Claris for FileMaker Pro 18.0.3, using the FileMaker Server Cloud 2.18 service on Amazon servers. Despite this, it was managed by Claris instead of through the Amazon Marketplace, and made use of the new FileMaker ID authentication.

=== Linux and Docker ===
In October 2020, Claris released a Linux version of FileMaker Server, first on CentOS (19.1) then on Ubuntu (19.2).

=== Version history ===
Date	Version	File Ext	Comment
1985–04	FileMaker v1.0	.fp	Published by Forethought Inc.
1986–08	FileMaker Plus	.fp	Published by Forethought Inc.
1988–06	FileMaker 4	.fp	Published by Nashoba Systems
1988–08	FileMaker II	.fp	First version to be published by Claris Corporation
1990–10	FileMaker Pro	.fp	
1992–10	FileMaker Pro 2	.fp	Windows version added
1993–08	FileMaker Pro 2.1	.fp	
1994–07	FileMaker Pro Server 2	.fp	
1995–12	FileMaker Pro 3	.fp3	Relational architecture, TCP/IP networking introduced
1996–01	FileMaker Pro Server 3	.fp3	
1997–09	FileMaker Pro 4	.fp4	Plug-in architecture introduced
1998–05	FileMaker Pro 4 Developer Edition	.fp4	Last version to be published by Claris. Aimed at expert/professional FileMaker users.
1999–06	FileMaker Pro 4.1v2	.fp4	First version to be published by FileMaker, Inc.
1999–09	FileMaker Pro 5	.fp5	Introduced a new file format (file extension .fp5)
1999–11	FileMaker Server 5	.fp5	
2001–04	FileMaker Pro 5.5	.fp5	Native support for Mac OS X, Windows 2000, Windows 95/98 and ME.
2001–07	FileMaker Server 5.5	.fp5	Windows 2000, Windows NT, Mac OS X, Mac OS 8.6, and Red Hat Linux. LDAP Support. Red Hat was short–lived and dropped support in the next version.
2002–09	FileMaker Pro 6*	.fp6	Last version to support Mac OS 8 and 9
2004–03	FileMaker Pro 7	.fp7	Multiple tables/file architecture introduced; multiple windows; relationships graph; calc variables; Improved security with individual accounts and passwords; introduced new file format .fp7; Mac version requires Mac OS X.
2005–08	FileMaker Pro 8*	.fp7	Scriptable creation of PDF reports; script variables; tabs on layouts
2006–01	FileMaker Mobile 8		FileMaker Mobile line discontinued
2006–07	FileMaker Pro 8.5*	.fp7	Mac OS X Universal Binary support, embedded browser (Web Viewer), object names
2007–07	FileMaker Pro/Server 9*	.fp7	Native support for the SQL databases MS SQL Server, MySQL, and Oracle. Conditional formatting
2009–01	FileMaker Pro/Server 10*	.fp7	Status area now horizontal; script triggering
2010–03	FileMaker Pro/Server 11*	.fp7	Charts, snapshot link, filtered portals, and recurring imports
2010–07	FileMaker Go 1.0		FileMaker for iOS
2010–09	FileMaker Go 1.1		PDF creation, photo support, import from FileMaker Pro
2011–04	FileMaker Go 1.2		Printing, signature capture, charts, enhanced PDF creation
2011–09	FileMaker Pro/Advanced 11.0v4*	.fp7	Lion compatibility, fully implemented by October 2011
2012–04	FileMaker Pro/Advanced 12	.fmp12	Integrated themes (Pro/iOS); floating and modal windows; execute SQL; enhanced container field; improved charting; introduced new file format .fmp12
2012–04	FileMaker Server 12		64-bit, faster WAN, progressive backups, rewritten web publishing engine, support for external container storage in files outside of the database
2012–04	FileMaker Go 12		iOS client is now free. Supports the .fmp12 file format.
2013–12	FileMaker Pro/Advanced 13	.fmp12	WebDirect and HTML5 features; better mobile app development; enhanced GUI design tools, themes, and behaviors; more dynamic data refreshing, "Hide object when..." layout object option based on calculation, encryption at rest (EAR 256bit AES) data protection, new summary list feature, enhanced ExecuteSQL expressions, perform script on server script step, 256bit SSL client server connection
2013–12	FileMaker Go 13		Free universal client for iPhones and iPads supports iOS 6 and iOS 7. Supports barcode scanning from the camera.
2013–12	FileMaker Server 13		FileMaker WebDirect, Perform Script on Server, Platform Security; new HTML5 Admin Console replaced the need for Java
2015–05	FileMaker Pro/Advanced 14	.fmp12	Script workspace, Button bar, Tooltips in layout mode, Launch Center
2015–05	FileMaker Server 14		Standby server, FileMaker Pro auto-reconnect, WebDirect support for Android
2015–05	FileMaker Go 14		Improved signature capture, iOS 8-style interface, Video/audio controls, Keyboard control, Rich editing
2016–05	FileMaker Pro/Advanced 15	.fmp12	In-Product Updates, Portal In-line Progress Bar, Concealed Edit Box, Script Workspace highlighting and unlimited undo
2016–05	FileMaker Server 15		External SQL Support extended to DB2 and PostgreSQL, SSL Certificate installation made easier, eliminated shared hosting, Licensing for Teams
2016–05	FileMaker Go 15		iOS SDK, Touch ID and 3D Touch, App Extensions and iBeacons
2016–09	FileMaker Cloud 1.0		FileMaker Server via Amazon Web Services (AWS) running on CentOS Linux
2017–05	FileMaker Pro/Advanced 16	.fmp12	Layout Objects window (control layers in layouts), Cards feature (better control of prompts), cURL support added for "Insert from URL" function (HTTP/S methods such as POST/GET), JSON text manipulation functions, data viewer auto calc
2017–05	FileMaker Server 16		REST-based FileMaker Data API, WebDirect browser support scalability up to 500 concurrent users, PDF generation on server and WebDirect, OAuth 2.0 support (Amazon, Google, Microsoft) at the Security layer
2017–05	FileMaker Go 16		Enhanced signature capture, geofence, plugin compatibility, animations, and transitions
2018–05	FileMaker Pro Advanced 17	.fmp12	No more FileMaker Pro without Advanced tools, Pre-made add-on tables to templates, Layout modification tool improvements, sensor support (barometer, GPS etc.), Self-Lookup table for Master-detail layouts, multiple email attachments, new data migration tool (separate application).
2018–05	FileMaker Server 17		redesigned server admin console with dashboard, new Admin API, new Data API completely re-written from v16.
2018–05	FileMaker Go 17		FileMaker Go push notifications, auto-complete, drag and drop, improved iOS app SDK
2019-05-22	FileMaker Pro Advanced 18	.fmp12	New user interface for importing data, open specific app at launch, file-based script steps, script error logging, while calculation function, SetRecursion calculation function, new managed security access privilege, new manage security dialog box, plug-in security enhancements, default file access protection.
2019-05-22	FileMaker Server 18		Page-Level Locking enables multiple simultaneous read operations on the same file, Startup Restoration automatically restores files after a crash, FileMaker Server Admin Console enhancements, server monitoring enhancements, FileMaker Data API enhancements, FileMaker Admin API is now standard, Spanish language support. Page-level locking can be enabled or disabled only together with startup restoration.
2019-05-22	FileMaker Go 18		Open specific app at launch, append to existing PDF, enhanced barcode support.
2020-05-20	FileMaker 19 (Pro, Server, Go)	.fmp12	JavaScript WebViewer Integration, FileMaker Add-Ons (including JavaScript), supports Apple's Dark/Light modes, Configure Machine Learning Models using CoreML, NFC scanning support, Siri Shortcuts, Card Windows now supported in WebDirect, Claris Marketplace, Print Page Numbers, Solution Upgrade Tool, At Start Open File, Minimum version requirement on live hosted files, Claris ID can automatically be logged in each time, Convert to/from FileMaker Paths, On-premise Server on CentOS, in addition, to already supported Windows Server & macOS, and Dates support Common Era formatting. No longer supports Runtimes, 32-bit apps, or Windows 7. Startup Restoration and page-level locking remain but are disabled by default probably because of a lot of problems in version 18 with it.
2020-10-28	FileMaker Server 19 for Linux, 19.1.2 stability update	.fmp12	First production release of FileMaker Server on standalone Linux since the short-lived v5.5 in 2001. The referenced Linux is CentOS Linux 7.8. Standalone Linux Server v19 can be hosted in the cloud and will replace FileMaker Cloud for AWS (formerly FileMaker Cloud 1.x) which goes End of Life on Jan. 1, 2022. Note that FileMaker Cloud is an entirely different product. FileMaker Server 19.1.2 replaces page-level locking and startup restoration features with a much more stable shared lock mechanism.
2020	FileMaker Pro 19.1.2	.fmp12	JavaScript Enabled Add-Ons, Preview improvements, AD FS support, Get(SystemLocaleElements), Get(FileLocaleElements), improved communication between JavaScript in Webview and FileMaker scripting.
2020-10	FileMaker Pro 19.1.3	.fmp12	New options for FMP URLs
2020-12	FileMaker Pro 19.2.1	.fmp12	Plugin control improvements
2021-03	FileMaker Pro 19.2.2	.fmp12	Preview Enhancements, Get(InstalledFMPPluginsAsJSON), Security improvements
2021-07	FileMaker Pro 19.3.2	.fmp12	Apple Silicon support, improved Microsoft Edge WebView2 control, and few other bug fixes
2021-11	FileMaker Pro 19.4.1	.fmp12	Shortcuts for Siri voice commands, Customizable OAuth identity provider support, new session identifier, Faster SQL queries, FileMaker_BaseTableFields, Data API improvements
2021-12	FileMaker Pro 19.4.2	.fmp12	SSL certificate improvements and some general bug fixes.
2022-05	FileMaker Pro 19.5.1	.fmp12	Security improvements and OpenSSL upgraded to 1.1.1n, some JSON function updates and ReadQRCode function, improved Save a copy as XML, tab order works pasting layouts as expected, performance improvements, some GUI improvements.
2022-07	FileMaker Pro and Server 19.5.2 released	.fmp12	Improved Replace Field Contents, Quote function modified to handle line feeds same as carriage returns.
2022-08	FileMaker Pro 19.5.3 released	.fmp12	Open SSL upgraded to version 1.1.q. and some bug fixes.
2022-09	FileMaker Pro and Server 19.5.4 released	.fmp12	Quick start removed, in-product notifications
2022-12	FileMaker Pro and Server 19.6.1 released	.fmp12	Script Transactions, Support Sign in with Apple, Clean up cache files from Preferences dialog, Set User Directory script step, Get ( CurrentTimeUTCMicroseconds ) calculation function, Add-on creation from Layout object tree, Controls the enablement of context menu within the interactive container fields, Administrator roles, Log viewer improvements, Supports a second additional database folder, Support Clone Only backup option to clone the database, Restrict access to Admin Console from specified IP addresses, Admin API improvements, WebDirect CSS layout caching, and list view behavior improvements, NodeJS upgrade to version 16.16, OpenSSL upgrade to version 3.0.7, ChartDirector upgrade to version 7.
2023-04-25	Claris FileMaker 2023 (20)	.fmp12	OnWindowTransaction trigger, Send Mail OAuth 2.0, PSOS with Callback, Layout Calculations
2024-06-04	Claris FileMaker 2024 (21)	.fmp12	New AI Script Steps, Configure Local Notifications in FileMaker Pro, WebRTC for Web Viewers, PSOS Callback State Option, Execute Data API Write Operations, Open Quickly Improvements

* (*) indicates both FileMaker Pro/FileMaker Pro Advanced (Developer Edition in v4-6) or FileMaker Server/FileMaker Server Advanced

FileMaker files are compatible between Mac and Windows. File type extensions are:

- .fm since FileMaker Pro 2.0
- .fp3 since FileMaker Pro 3.0
- .fp5 since FileMaker Pro 5.0 (including 5, 5.5, 6.0)
- .fp7 since FileMaker Pro 7.0 (including 7, 8, 8.5, 9, 10, 11 and FileMaker Go 1.0)
- .fmp12 since FileMaker Pro 12 (including 12, 13, 14, 15, 16, 17, 18, 19, FileMaker 2023, and FileMaker 2024)

Self-running applications (runtime, kiosk mode) are platform-specific only.

== Internationalization and localization ==
FileMaker is available in worldwide English, Simplified Chinese, Dutch, French, German, Italian, Japanese, Korean, Brazilian Portuguese, Spanish, and Swedish.

There are also specific versions of FileMaker for users of Central European, Indian and Middle Eastern languages. These versions offer spellchecking, data entry, sorting and printing options for languages of the respective region. They also contain localized templates and localized instant web publishing.

The Central European version FileMaker includes English, Russian, Polish, Czech and Turkish interfaces. There are customized templates for Russian, Polish, Czech, Turkish. In addition Russian, Greek, Estonian, Lithuanian, Latvian, Serbian, Bulgarian and Hungarian are supported to varying degrees.

The version intended for Southeast Asian languages has only an English user interface, but supports Indic-language data entry, sorting and indexing in Hindi, Marathi, Bengali, Panjabi, Gujarati, Tamil, Telugu, Kannada and Malayalam.

Similarly, the Middle Eastern version has only English and French user interfaces, but with its option to change the text direction to right-to-left, it does support Arabic and Hebrew data entry.

== Scripting ==
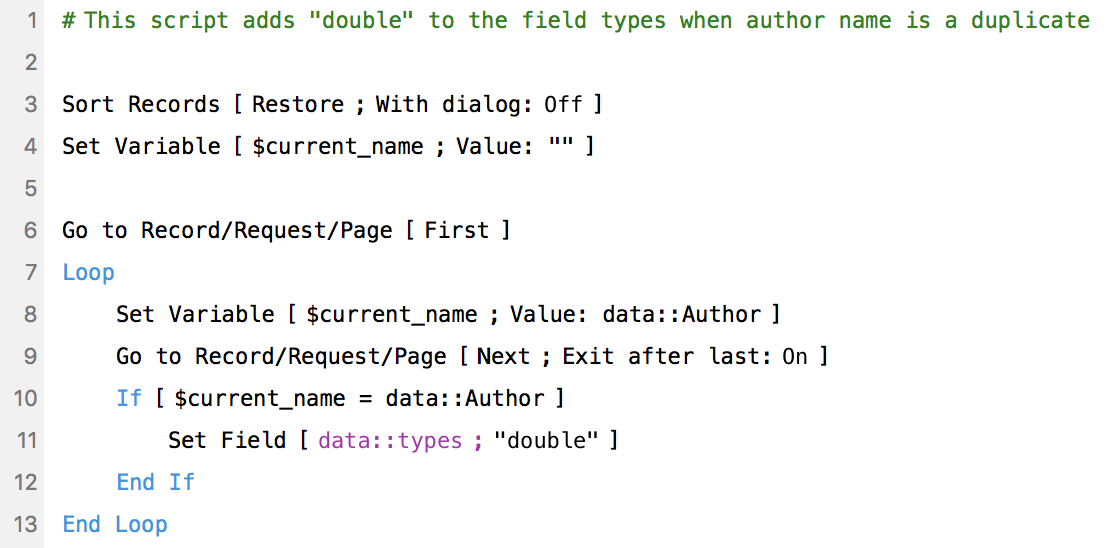
A simple FileMaker script that flags duplicate entries in a list of names

FileMaker Pro and FileMaker Pro Advanced include scripting capabilities and many built-in functions for automation of common tasks and complex calculations. Numerous steps are available for navigation, conditional execution of script steps, editing records, and other utilities. FileMaker Pro Advanced provides a script debugger which allows the developer to set break points, monitor data values and step through script lines.

FileMaker 13 introduced a script that more deeply queries container field document metadata.

=== Dynamic Markup Language ===
The FileMaker Dynamic Markup Language or FDML was a markup language used in the earlier versions of FileMaker introduced in 1998. FDML is also often referred to as Claris Dynamic Markup Language or CDML, named after its former company Claris. FDML was an extension of HTML that used special tags, such as [FMP-Record][/FMP-Record] to display FileMaker data on Web pages. FileMaker officially dropped support for FDML in 2004.

== SQL and ODBC support ==
Since version 9, FileMaker has had the ability to connect to a number of SQL databases without resorting to using SQL, including MySQL, SQL Server, and Oracle. This requires installation of the SQL database ODBC driver (in many cases a third-party license per client driver) to connect to a SQL database. Through Extended SQL Services (ESS), SQL databases can be used as data sources in FileMaker's relationship graph, thus allowing the developer to create new layouts based on the SQL database; create, edit, and delete SQL records via FileMaker layouts and functions; and reference SQL fields in FileMaker calculations and script steps. It is a cross-platform relational database application.

Versions from FileMaker Pro 5.5 onwards also have an ODBC interface.

FileMaker 12 introduced a new function, ExecuteSQL, which allows the user to perform an SQL query against the FileMaker database to retrieve data, but does not allow data modification or deletion, or schema changes.

FileMaker allows non-numeric characters to be stored in its "numeric" field type unless the field is specifically marked as strictly "numeric".

Through a third party, Actual Technologies, FileMaker 15 and forward, also, support ODBC connectivity to IBM I 7.3 (AS/400), IBM Db2 11.1, and PostgreSQL 9.6.12. Using the Actual Adapter, these ODBC connections can also make ESS connections and be used as sources in the Relationship Graph.

== Integration ==
FileMaker 16 provides integrations via cURL, JSON, REST-based FileMaker Data API support. Tableau Web Data Connector is offered to visualize FileMaker data. The REST-based API license is a free trial that expired September 27, 2018. FileMaker 17 offers a permanent REST-based Data API. Standard licensing include 2 GB of outbound data per user per month. Container data does not count towards this limit, and inbound Data API data transfer is unlimited. FileMaker 19 for Linux and FileMaker Cloud provide a OData gateway, allowing JSON and XML output (Atom).

== In popular culture ==
In Julio Torres's 2023 film Problemista, a major story element is the insistence by the character Elizabeth (Tilda Swinton) that her husband's art be catalogued using FileMaker Pro, "the Cadillac of archival software," and her refusal to consider alternatives like Google Sheets. The character Alejandro (Torres) falsely claims familiarity with FileMaker Pro with the hope that Elizabeth will sponsor his work visa.

== See also ==
- Bento, a simplified personal database application from FileMaker Inc. (discontinued mid-2013)
