= List of companies headquartered in San Diego =

This is a list of companies headquartered or formerly headquartered in San Diego, California.

== Companies headquartered in San Diego ==
Apparel

- Bad Boy
- Blenders Eyewear
- Cool-jams
- Reef
- Tribal Gear

Biotechnology

- Abgent
- Acadia Pharmaceuticals
- Accelrys / Biovia (acquired by Dassault Systèmes)
- Allerca
- Amylin Pharmaceuticals
- Apricus Biosciences
- Arena Pharmaceuticals
- Cytori Therapeutics
- Genesee Scientific
- Genomics Institute of the Novartis Research Foundation
- Halozyme Therapeutics
- Hologic
- Illumina
- Integrated Genetics
- InvivoGen
- La Jolla Institute for Immunology
- Neurocrine Biosciences
- NuVasive
- Quidel Corporation
- ResMed
- Salk Institute for Biological Studies
- Sanford-Burnham Medical Research Institute
- The Scripps Research Institute
- Sequenom

Computer software

- Abacus Data Systems
- Aonix
- AstroPrint
- BackBone (acquired by Quest Software)
- Classy
- ClickUp
- DivX
- ESET, NA
- FutureWave (acquired by Macromedia)
- Mitchell International
- Peregrine Systems (acquired by Hewlett-Packard)
- Semantic Research
- Silicon Beach (acquired by Aldus)
- SweetLabs
- Tealium
- Teradata

Consumer goods

- Dr. Bronner's Magic Soaps
- ProFlowers (acquired by Liberty Media)
- WD-40 Company

Defense contracting

- Cubic
- General Atomics
- Kratos Defense & Security Solutions

Electronics

- American Technology Corporation
- Chassis Plans
- Mad Catz, Inc. (defunct)
- Philips

Energy

- Maxwell Technologies
- MobileOne
- San Diego Gas & Electric
- Sempra Energy
- Solar Turbines

Entertainment

- Daybreak Game Company
- The Lot
- Nautilus Entertainment Design

Finance and insurance

- California Bank & Trust
- California Coast Credit Union
- Commonwealth Financial Network
- Encore Capital Group
- LPL Financial
- Midland Credit Management, Inc.

Food and drink

- AleSmith Brewing
- Ballast Point Brewing Company (acquired by Constellation Brands)
- Bumble Bee Foods
- Burger Lounge
- Green Flash Brewing Company
- Hash House a go go
- Jack in the Box
- Karl Strauss Brewing
- Pat & Oscar's
- Qdoba
- Rubio's Fresh Mexican Grill (acquired by Mill Road Capital)
- Souplantation (defunct)
- Stone Brewing

Health

- CareFusion (acquired by Becton Dickinson)
- Dexcom
- Rock My World, Inc.
- Scripps Health
- Sharp HealthCare

Internet

- MindTouch
- Miva Merchant
- Satellite Internet
- SwoopThat.com
- Tealium
- Veoh

Media

- Her Sports San Diego
- McKinnon Broadcasting
- Mission Times Courier
- One America News Network
- San Diego Business Journal
- San Diego City Beat
- San Diego Jewish Journal
- San Diego Magazine
- San Diego Reader
- San Diego Union-Tribune (acquired by Tribune Publishing)
- Times of San Diego

Retail

- Le Travel Store (closed)
- Petco
- PriceSmart
- Zion Market (시은마켓)

Sports

- BikeBandit
- BMC USA
- Competitor Group, Inc.
- Ellsworth Handcrafted Bicycles
- Sector 9

Technology

- Comma.ai
- Psyonix
- Workiz
- Zesty.io

Telecommunications

- Continuous Computing
- Cricket Communications (acquired by AT&T)
- Jump Mobile (defunct)
- Leap Wireless (acquired by AT&T)
- Metric Systems Corporation
- Nokia UMT
- Qualcomm
- Skyriver
- SMS.ac, Inc.

Transportation and logistics

- Cubic Transportation Systems
- National Steel and Shipbuilding
- Ryan Aeronautical

Other

- The Allen Group
- Anacomp
- Champion Ballroom Academy
- Kyocera
- OliverMcMillan
- Peregrine Semiconductor
- Quality Assurance International
- Realty Income Corporation

== Companies headquartered in San Diego County ==
Notable companies and corporations headquartered outside San Diego, but within San Diego County include:

Apparel

- Atticus Clothing
- Fallen Footwear
- Nixon

Biotechnology

- Isis Pharmaceuticals
- TimeLogic

Consumer goods

- Natural Alternatives International

Electronics

- Hitachi Data Systems
- NTN Buzztime
- Pulse~Link

Food and drink

- Coco's Bakery
- Daphne's Greek Cafe
- Islands Fine Burgers & Drinks
- Stone Brewing
- Perfect Snacks

Musical instruments

- Carvin Corporation
- Deering Banjo Company
- Taylor Guitars

Sports equipment

- Callaway Golf
- Cobra Golf
- TaylorMade Golf
- VolleyHut.com

Telecommunications

- Viasat, Inc.

Transportation and logistics

- Advanced Aircraft
- SpaceDev, Inc

Other

- CineForm
- Hunter Industries
- Jenny Craig, Inc
- Rockstar San Diego
- Upper Deck Company
