= Charlie Jackson (software) =

American computer software entrepreneur

Charlie Jackson (born 1948) is an American computer software entrepreneur who founded Silicon Beach Software in 1984 and co-founded FutureWave Software in 1993. FutureWave created the first version of what is now Adobe Flash. He was an early investor in Wired magazine, Outpost.com, Streamload and Angelic Pictures. Jackson is currently founder/CEO of Silicon Beach Software, which develops and publishes application software for Windows 10.

== Business life ==
=== Startups ===
Jackson founded Silicon Beach Software in 1984. The company developed and published Macintosh software. It was best known for its graphics editors SuperPaint, Digital Darkroom and the multimedia authoring application SuperCard. Silicon Beach was acquired by Aldus Corporation in 1990. That year he was named Entrepreneur of the Year in San Diego for High Tech.

In 1984, Jackson also founded the San Diego Macintosh User Group.

Jackson co-founded FutureWave Software with Jonathan Gay in 1993. FutureWave developed and published FutureSplash Animator. Macromedia acquired FutureWave in 1996 and renamed the product Flash 1.0, which in turn became Adobe Flash when Macromedia was acquired by Adobe Systems.

Since late 2009, Jackson has been a mentor for San Diego sessions of the Founder Institute.

In 2015, using the name Silicon Beach Software again, he founded a company to develop graphics software for Windows 10. The company's first product is SaviDraw.

=== Investments ===
Although no longer an active seed investor, Jackson made some notable investments in the 1990s. In 1993, he and Nicholas Negroponte were the two seed investors in Wired magazine. In 1994, Jackson loaned Wired Ventures the money that allowed the company to start up HotWired, the first commercial web magazine.

Jackson was the seed investor in Outpost.com, an early online reseller of computer equipment. Outpost.com gained some notoriety for its TV ads in which gerbils were shot out of a cannon and wolves attacked a high school marching band.

Jackson was the first investor in Angelic Pictures, Inc.

Jackson was the first investor in Streamload, an online media storage and retrieval company that was subsequently renamed Nirvanix and he was the first investor in Pacific Coast Software, publisher of WebCatalog, an e-commerce package.

=== Other Businesses ===
Jackson is a principal in Angelic Pictures, Inc., a movie production company. He has been an executive producer of Angelic's movies, The Month of August, Hole in One: American Pie Plays Golf, Beach Bar, Music High, La Migra, Fearless and Space Samurai: Oasis.

Jackson founded Silicon Beach Software in 2015. It is a developer/publisher of multimedia software for Windows 10.

Jackson owned two small businesses in San Diego, CA. Epic Volleyball Club was a junior volleyball organization which trained approximately 400 athletes annually. VolleyHut.com was an online reseller of volleyball equipment. In 2000, VolleyHut challenged Amazon.com on its use of patents. Both businesses were shut down after pandemic lockdowns.

== Early life and education ==
Jackson grew up in Imperial Beach, California. As a teenager, he also spent three years in Istanbul, Turkey, where he earned a B.E.P.C. degree from a French school. Jackson graduated from Mar Vista High School in Imperial Beach in 1967, and was later inducted into the inaugural class of the Sweetwater Union High School District Hall of Fame in 2001. He earned a BA degree in Near Eastern Studies from UCLA in 1972, a master's degree in linguistics from San Diego State in 1978 and a C.Phil. in linguistics from UCSD in 1980.

Jackson was an active duty Marine Corps officer from 1972 to 1976 and Reserve officer from 1976 to 1989.

== Sports ==
Jackson's sporting background is varied and extensive. While in Istanbul, he won the county youth championship in pole vault. In high school, he competed in cross country and track and field.

At UCLA, Jackson was a letter winner in soccer and lightweight rowing. His senior year he was co-captain of the lightweight rowing team.

In the Marine Corps, Jackson became a competitive rifle and pistol shooter, earning the Marine Corps' highest award for rifle shooting, the Distinguished badge. In 1978, he was the High Marine at the National Championships for Service Rifle, held at Camp Perry, Ohio.

In the '90s, Jackson returned to competitive shooting. In 1993 and 1994, he earned a spot on the US National Team in Rapid Fire Pistol and competed internationally. In 1996, his three-man team won the U.S. National Championship in Rapid Fire Pistol.

In 1994, Jackson attended the World Masters Games in Brisbane, Australia, where over 24,000 athletes competed for World Championship titles in their respective age groups. In the 45 - 49 age group, Jackson won Gold medals in Rapid Fire Pistol and 4-man Beach Volleyball and a Silver medal in 2-man Beach Volleyball.

From 1997 to 2000, Jackson served on the board of USA Volleyball, chairing the Olympic Beach Volleyball Committee. Jackson was a member of the 2000 U.S. Olympic Team in the capacity of Assistant Team Leader, Beach Volleyball.

In 2000 and 2001, Jackson owned and operated Beach Volleyball America (BVA), a U.S. professional beach volleyball tour.

From 1999 to 2021, Jackson owned and operated Epic Volleyball Club, a junior club in the San Diego area.
