= Color Dark Castle =

1994 video game

- Color Dark Castle application icon
- Developer: Delta Tao
- Publisher: Delta Tao
- Designer: Joe Williams
- Platform: Apple Macintosh
- Release: 1994
- Genre: Platform game
- Mode: Single player

Color Dark Castle is a platform computer game developed and published by Delta Tao Software. It is the first entry in the Dark Castle series developed after the rights were sold from Silicon Beach Software to Delta Tao in 1994. This game is essentially a remake of the original Dark Castle, in color. Delta Tao reported that they had to redo all the code from scratch (the original Dark Castle was written in assembly language); also, they added new rooms, a new difficulty, and an alleged "Secret Level". Since this is a remake, the sequel to it would be Beyond Dark Castle. Another color version of Dark Castle was announced in 2000, titled Return to Dark Castle. As of 2007, the game was finished by Z Sculpt Entertainment, and was made available by spring of 2008.

== Features ==
Although Color Dark Castle featured almost identical gameplay to Dark Castle, being a remake, Delta Tao also added a few of their own things, such as a new difficulty "Novice" for beginner players, eliminating some of the harder levels in the game and having fewer monsters. Also, the great hall's door setup was static, as opposed to the random setup of the original. There was a new "Secret level" added, it was accessed by hitting 4 spots hidden throughout the game, without dying. They added a save system that allows one save, that can be saved, or loaded from the great hall.

Inside Mac Games complimented Color Dark Castle for including the rooms from the original Dark Castle while also including new elements such as additional rooms that had the effect of making the game come out even better than the original.

== Story ==
The evil Black Knight terrorizes the townspeople, our hero Prince Duncan decides to topple his throne, but in order to do that, he must travel to the four sections of the castle: Fireball, Shield, Trouble, and Black Knight.

After collecting the Fireball, and Shield, Duncan makes his way to The Black Knight's Throne room, where he topples the Black Knight's Throne. On Novice, Beginner, and Intermediate the Black Knight stands up shaking his fist, as a gargoyle takes Duncan to Trouble 3. On advanced The Black Knight's throne falls off the bottom of the screen, while Duncan dances, and it fades out.

== Remakes ==
At the end of the credits, the game states: "Watch out next year for Beyond Dark Castle," but this planned release was dropped due to the announcement of Return to Dark Castle, which is a sequel to Beyond Dark Castle in full color, including all the levels from Dark Castle and Beyond Dark Castle. It was ultimately released on March 14, 2008 and was developed by Z Sculpt.

A remake of the original version for mobile was released in 2006. It is developed by Super Happy Fun Fun and published by Bandai. It contains slightly remade level designs, as well as updated color graphics.
