= Mar Vista High School =

Public high school in Imperial Beach, California, United States

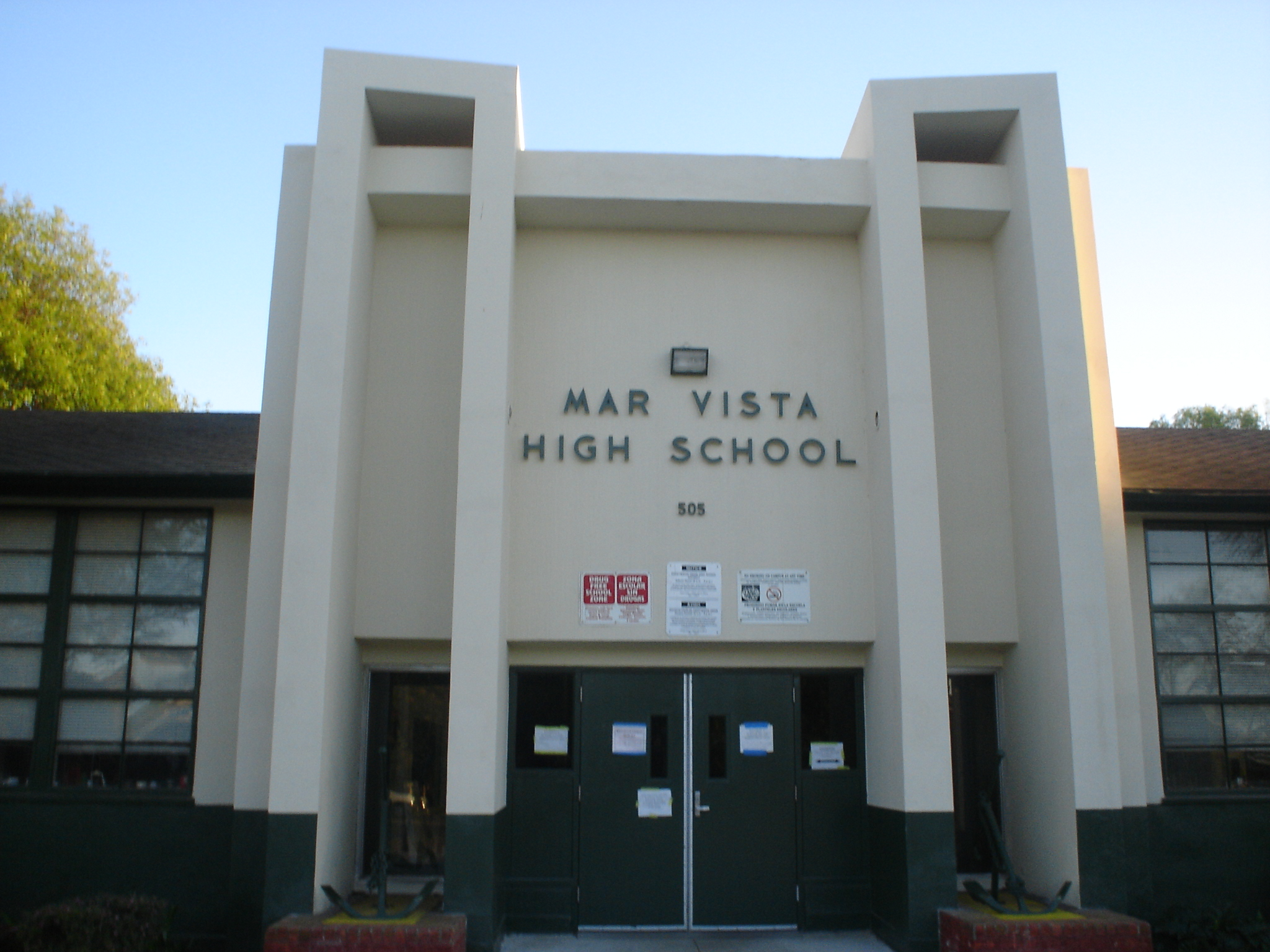
- Main entrance of Mar Vista High School

Location
- 505 Elm Avenue; Imperial Beach, California 91932-2099; United States
- 32°34′48″N 117°7′20″W

Information
- Established: 1951
- School district: Sweetwater Union High School District
- Superintendent: Moisés G. Aguirre
- Principal: Teresa Kramer
- Teaching staff: 56.83 (on an FTE basis)
- Grades: 9-12
- Enrollment: 1,266 (2023–2024)
- Student to teacher ratio: 22.28
- Colors: Green, gold and white
- Athletics: 16 sports
- Mascot: Marty the Mariner, Poseidon
- Team name: Mariners
- Accreditation: Western Association of Schools and Colleges
- Newspaper: Sea Breeze; Mar Vista Times
- Yearbook: The Log
- Website: Mar Vista High School

Mar Vista Senior High (MVH) is a public grades 9-12 secondary school in Imperial Beach, California, United States. It was established in 1951. The school borders Elm Avenue to the north, Imperial Beach Avenue to the south, and Imperial Beach Charter School to the east. Mar Vista currently enrolls 1,266 students.

Mar Vista has a marine science academy called Poseidon.It is frequently called "a school within a school."An NJROTC program is also located on campus.

== History ==
=== Sexual misconduct ===
On 1 March 2017, an NJROTC assistant who was previously employed at Coronado High School, was charged with statutory rape of a minor who was enrolled at Mar Vista. The instructor, who was hired as a substitute teacher for the 2016 school year, was alleged to have left Coronado High due to improper behavior to female students.The plaintiff alledged that Coronado had failed to report the misconduct to Naval Service Training Command or Sweetwater Union. Coronado High School District was dropped from the lawsuit after failing to provide any documentation regarding Gallegos.The instructor pled guilty and Sweetwater Union agreed to pay $2.2 million to the minor, who was an adult at the time of trial.

On 19 May 2025, a student aide at Mar Vista under contract with Ro Health, was arrested on grounds of sexually assaulting a 17-year old who was enrolled at the school. The student aide was not an employee at the school.The student aide originally pled not guilty, but later pled guilty in September.She was placed on a work furlough, plus probation, and a ten-year protective order between her and the student.

== Notable alumni ==
- Brian Bilbray (1970), Member of the U.S. House of Representatives from California's 50th district; former mayor of Imperial Beach, California; former San Diego County supervisor
- Serge Dedina (1982), former mayor of Imperial Beach and executive director of Wildcoast
- Charlie Jackson (1967), founder of Silicon Beach Software and FutureWave Software
- Esteban Loaiza (1990), professional baseball player
- Eleanor Mariano (1973), Rear Admiral, US Navy; served as White House Physician under Presidents Bill Clinton and George W. Bush
- Matthew Modine (1977), actor
- Jerry Overton (1958), professional football player
