= Jonathan Gay =

American computer programmer

- Born: 1967 (age 58–59)
- Education: Harvey Mudd College
- Occupations: Computer programmer, software entrepreneur
- Known for: Co-founding FutureWave Software (1993); Flash Programmer

Jonathan Gay (born 1967) is an American computer programmer and software entrepreneur based in Northern California. Gay co-founded FutureWave Software in 1993. For a decade, he was the main programmer and visionary of Flash, an animation editor for web pages. He founded Software as Art, which was later renamed Greenbox, which made energy management solutions for the home.

== Early days ==
While in high school, Gay won a science fair award for programming on an Apple II computer and came to the attention of Silicon Beach Software founder Charlie Jackson. Gay began programming for Silicon Beach in his senior year. His first published product, released in 1985, was Airborne!, a black-and-white game for the Macintosh computer. While in college, he collaborated with game designer Mark Pierce and programmed Dark Castle and Beyond Dark Castle. All three were award-winning programs that included digital sounds, an unusual innovation for that era.

After graduating from Harvey Mudd College in Claremont, California, Gay worked full-time for Silicon Beach Software. During this time he added some significant features to Superpaint 2, including Bézier curves, and began work on IntelliDraw, which was published by Aldus Corporation after the acquisition of Silicon Beach Software in 1990.

== FutureWave Software ==
In 1993, Gay and Jackson founded FutureWave Software with the intention of creating graphics software for pen computing, in particular the Penpoint operating system that ran on the EO Personal Communicator.

Gay and programmer Robert Tatsumi finished the company's first product in 1994, SmartSketch, a vector-drawing program for the PenPoint operating system. Shortly thereafter, PenPoint was discontinued, ending that market for SmartSketch. SmartSketch was ported to the Windows and Macintosh operating systems, but with the advent in 1995 of the World Wide Web, Gay saw an opportunity to create an editor that could produce animations for web pages. The core technology of SmartSketch was repurposed to create a new product, FutureSplash Animator, adding support for timeline animation and a Netscape browser plug-in for playing back content.

FutureSplash Animator was released in May, 1996.

== Macromedia ==
When MSN and Disney decided to use FutureSplash Animator for their websites, Macromedia made an offer to buy FutureWave Software and the acquisition was completed in December, 1996. FutureSplash Animator was renamed Flash 1.0.

=== Flash and Director ===
The acquisition of FutureWave by Macromedia was unusual in that Macromedia's flagship product, Macromedia Director, overlapped with FutureSplash's functionality in many ways. Both were essentially animation/multimedia solutions consisting of an authoring tool and a browser plug-in runtime. As a Web technology, Flash had the advantage of a smaller runtime (on the order of 100 kilobytes, whereas Director's Shockwave runtime weighed over a megabyte), as well as a learning curve that was significantly less steep owing to the lower complexity of the product. Director was weighed down by six releases of accumulated legacy, and in particular because its original target was the CD-ROM market, not the Web.

Initially, the nascent Flash team within Macromedia was quite small, with few engineers beyond Gay and Tatsumi, and corporate R&D investment in Director remained high. Over the years that followed, the Director team would shrink to a handful of people and the Flash team would grow rapidly as Flash came to dominate the market for Web-based interactive media. Macromedia wrestled with the cross-product positioning of Flash and Director for several years, trying repeatedly and with limited success to position Director as the "big brother" to Flash, to be used for situations where Flash hit its limitations. Director continues to be one of the most popular tools for authoring multimedia CD-ROMs, although Flash is also used for this purpose.

=== Flash 1–4 ===
Gay took on the role of Vice President of Engineering at Macromedia and led the newly minted Flash engineering team at Macromedia's headquarters in San Francisco, beginning a decade of leading the Flash agenda at Macromedia. In an unusual move for a vice president, Gay continued to be responsible for a great deal of the actual coding on the product. He was responsible for the low-level vector graphics rasterization, pen-computing inspired drawing tools, and the Flash Player Netscape browser plug-in. Tatsumi wrote the bulk of the user interface code for the Flash authoring tool. During these early releases, only a handful of other engineers joined the Flash team. An important addition to the team was programmer Gary Grossman, who implemented a subset of JavaScript (called ActionScript) into Flash 4. This expanded programming capability allowed Flash to be used for many different purposes.

=== Tin Can ===
As the engineering team grew in size, other engineers began to step in and take over pieces of the Flash codebase, freeing Gay up to focus on higher-level product strategy. After Flash 4, he took on more of a pure leadership role, continuing to guide the evolution of Flash from an animation engine to a full-featured multimedia runtime and application platform.

During the development of Flash 5, Gay took a several month hiatus from day-to-day operations of the Flash team to think about new projects of strategic importance to the company. At that time, engineering VP Peter Santangeli took over leadership of the Flash team and would lead the team for Flash 5 and Flash MX. When Jon returned, he was armed with a vision for a new class of Web applications that enabled communication, collaboration and what he called "online storytelling." He saw the Flash Player's success and ubiquity as an opportunity for bringing the real-time communication technology that these applications would require to every computer running the Flash Player.

He founded a new team alongside the Flash team to fulfill this vision, building a product which he code named "Tin Can," a reference to the tin can telephone made by children using two tin cans and a string. This new team and the Flash team worked together to incorporate two-way, real-time video and audio technology into the Flash Player, the first incarnation of which was released in March 2002 as part of Macromedia Flash Player 6. At the same time, the Tin Can team built a new server product, Flash Communication Server (now Flash Media Server), which communicated with the Flash Player over a new real-time protocol called RTMP. Tin Can could be used for use cases as simple as streaming a video over the Web, or as sophisticated as a videoconferencing system.

The new video-enabled Flash Player quickly became one of the most popular means of deploying video on the World Wide Web. The Flash Player's ubiquity enabled Flash video to bypass a principal drawback of competing video technologies, which was the requirement for the end-user to download and install an additional browser plug-in or helper application. Other advantages of Flash video were the lack of "chrome" around the video player window which competing players typically displayed, and the customizability of the interface which enabled Web developers to create their own stylized video-playing widgets in Flash. Flash video is now an essential technology used by prominent Web sites such as YouTube, NBC.com, DailyMotion, MetaCafe and JumpCut.

=== Breeze ===
Ben Dillon and Peter Santangeli went on to found the Breeze team at Macromedia, building an enterprise-class Web conferencing, E-Learning and collaboration system on top of the Flash Media Server. Gay served as the engineering lead and product visionary for the "Breeze Live" web conferencing elements of the product. Despite the possibly revolutionary nature of the communication capabilities of the Flash Media Server, it did not meet initially with great business success. Macromedia saw Breeze as a means of getting Flash Media Server "over the hump." By building a solution on top of Breeze, the Breeze team had many goals: it sought to demonstrate what kind of applications could be built on the Flash Media Server platform, explore a new business model for a company traditionally focused on shrink-wrap tools software, and understand the attendant difficulties in building applications on the Flash Media Server platform.

Incorporating technology acquired from Presedia, Breeze translated Microsoft PowerPoint presentations into Flash SWF files which could be viewed on the Web, with an accompanying audio track recorded by the presenter. Breeze could be used for a variety of uses, including corporate presentations, quarterly earnings calls, and distance learning. Breeze also featured "Breeze Live," a conferencing system built as a Flash application which utilized the Flash Media Server to enable two-way video/audio chat, shared whiteboarding, screen sharing and shared presentation viewing. Following the Adobe Systems acquisition of Macromedia, Breeze became Adobe Connect.

=== Success of Flash ===
By 2001, there were 50 people working on Flash, 500,000 developers were using it and over 325 million people had the Flash Player that worked with their web browsers.

In 2007, a survey found that the Flash Player was installed on 96% of Internet-enabled desktops worldwide and was used by over 2 million professionals.

== Work after Macromedia ==
On April 18, 2005, Adobe Systems, Inc. announced the acquisition of Macromedia. Gay ultimately decided to pursue other opportunities in lieu of joining the combined company. When Gay left Macromedia in December 2005, he held the title of Chief Technology Officer.

=== Software as Art ===
In August 2006, Gay founded a new software venture, Software as Art, in partnership with three other former veterans of the Flash and Breeze teams, Tatsumi, Grossman, and Santangeli. The company developed energy management solutions for the home.

=== Silver Spring Networks ===
In October 2009, Software as Art (by then renamed Greenbox) was acquired by Silver Spring Networks.

=== Leaving IT ===
In May 2010, he was running a small business selling grass-fed beef direct to consumers.

=== Explory ===
In May 2013, he tried to return into software business, launching successful Kickstarter campaign for Explory, mobile video app.
