= Eric's Cascade =

1998 screensaver

- Developer: Delta Tao Software
- Publisher: Delta Tao Software
- Designer: Eric Snider
- Programmer: Eric Snider
- Platform: Power Macintosh
- Release: January 6, 1998

Eric's Cascade is a screensaver type program developed by Eric Snider for the PowerPC Macintosh. The publisher described it as "not exactly a game, not exactly a utility...".

== Development ==
Eric's Cascade began as a computer graphics experiment by Drew Olbrich while working at Pacific Data Images. Olbrich's "experimental particle simulation of water pouring out of a tap" ran on a Silicon Graphics workstation. In exchange for an agreement for a small portion of the revenue Olbrich allowed Snider to begin work on a version for a Mac. With the aid of others at Apple, the code was optimized to run in real time at an acceptable framerate.

It was never considered releasing Eric's Cascade as a game, and it was released as a "software toy"/screensaver. The player can set several water spigots at angles of their choice, with the water dyed a variety of colours and the water guided, reflected or sucked to create droplets all over the screen.

Washington Apple Pi Journal called it a "water fountain simulator". Optional sound effects and music could be played. Various taps, blocks and spinners could be placed, and circular "magnets" could be used to attract or repel water.

== Release ==
The manual included a biography of Eric Snider. The software was supplied on a CD-ROM which included demos of other Delta Tao software, including Eric's Ultimate Solitaire.

== Reception ==
Washington Apple Pi Journal said it is a "great and useful program", despite doing nothing useful.

MacAddict found the controls to be smooth, and the program a great indicator of the speed of the users Mac.

Craig Crossman considered it as a waterfall simulator, with creating and watching waterfalls relaxing.
