= Return to Dark Castle =

2008 video game

- Developers: Z Sculpt Entertainment; Delta Tao Software
- Publishers: 2008 Super Happy Fun Fun, Inc. 2026 Re-Release: Ludit Games
- Designers: Zack Morris; Zackary Black
- Platforms: 2008 Version: Mac OS X 2026 Version: Mac / Windows and Linux
- Release: From Super Happy Fun Fun, Inc.: March 14, 2008 From Ludit Games: March 3, 2026.
- Genre: Platform
- Mode: Single-player

Return to Dark Castle is a 2008 platform game for Mac OS X developed by Z Sculpt. It is the third game in the Dark Castle series, following Dark Castle (1986) and Beyond Dark Castle (1987) originally created by Mark Pierce, Jonathan Gay and Eric Zocher and published by Silicon Beach Software.

Development on the RTDC, begun in 1996, was notoriously protracted, and the game was often labeled vaporware. Return to Dark Castle was originally scheduled to be released in Winter 2000, but was not released until March 14, 2008. It brought colour to the original black and white graphics, integrated the gameplay and all 30 levels of both the original games, and added 50 new levels. In February 2011, Super Happy Fun Fun, Inc. released an updated version of the game on the Mac App Store.

In November of 2025, Return to Dark Castle showed up on Steam. On March 3, 2026, Return to Dark Castle released on Steam for Windows and Linux, and on the Mac App Store for Mac OS X.

== Plot ==
The player fights their way through various areas, inside and around the Dark Castle, in an attempt to defeat the Black Knight. The player's character, named Bryant by default, is the nephew of Duncan, the protagonist of the earlier Dark Castle games. In the game's intro, it is revealed that Duncan never returned from his quest to the Dark Castle. Bryant now approaches the castle in an attempt to succeed where Duncan had apparently failed. Bryant must collect 10 orbs hidden around the castle (similar to the orbs from Beyond Dark Castle) before he can confront the Black Knight.

If Bryant defeats the Black Knight on any difficulty other than advanced, the Black Knight chides him for wanting an ending but expending too little effort. If Bryant defeats the Black Knight on advanced difficulty, the Black Knight's armor is knocked off, revealing Duncan, now old and with gray hair and beard. Duncan and Bryant are forced to flee the castle, as the Black Knight's armor had imprisoned Duncan and now threatens to imprison them anew. Duncan and Bryant descend a rope to the Black Knight's Pier and there board a ship to visit an unnamed destination that Duncan always wanted to see.

== Gameplay ==
The previous games each had 15 levels, and Return to Dark Castle contains all the levels from these first two games plus over 50 new levels. The new areas are a mixture of single-screen levels, in the style of the first two games, and larger horizontally and vertically scrolling levels. The levels contain 25 orbs, 10 of which are required in order to complete the game. Many of the new levels contain secret areas which can be accessed by activating hidden doors and switches.

The gameplay is, with a few notable exceptions, essentially identical to its predecessors. Bryant's principal weapon remains the rock which can be magically upgraded to the fireball, and a magical shield can be obtained. New features include the ability to carry weapons in the player's inventory as well as the ability to keep teleportation potions in the inventory. As he explores the castle, Bryant will also come across additional weapons and defenses that were not available in the original game.

Unlike the original game, Bryant's progress is saved each time he returns to the Great Hall, Ante Room or Ante Room II. These three interconnected rooms are the "starting" points for the original Dark Castle, Beyond Dark Castle and Return to Dark Castle, respectively. This allows a player to save their progress and return later, which is important given the large number of additional levels compared to the original games.

Another new feature is the ability to record sessions. These recording files can be shared with others players, although recordings from different versions of Return to Dark Castle are not compatible, and there are playback bugs, particularly in longer recordings.

== Level editor ==
A feature allowing players to create their own levels was added in an update released in August 2013, five years after the game's original release.
