= Tag management system =

Behavior tracking for digital marketing

A tag management system (TMS) is a software solution that helps manage the lifecycle of digital marketing tags (sometimes referred to as tracking pixels, web beacons, or snippets of JavaScript code) used to collect and share data across digital properties such as websites and web applications. A TMS allows marketers and developers to efficiently deploy, update, and manage these tags without extensive manual coding, and can also be used to implement dynamic website or application changes based on user behavior or contextual data.

== History ==
Before the advent of tag management systems in the late 2000s, adding or modifying tracking tags required web developers to manually edit the website's source code. This process was slow, error-prone, and created a bottleneck for marketing departments, which needed to quickly deploy new campaigns and analytics tools. The proliferation of digital marketing technologies led to "tag chaos," where websites became bloated with dozens of tags, negatively impacting page load speed and creating data governance challenges.

Companies like TagMan (founded in 2007), Tealium (2008), and Ensighten (2009) were among the early pioneers in the enterprise TMS space. Google launched its free offering, Google Tag Manager, in 2012, which significantly accelerated the adoption of tag management across websites of all sizes.

== Functionality ==
A tag management system replaces multiple manually embedded tags with a single container tag that is installed across all areas of a digital property. Within this container, individual tags are triggered (“fired”) as appropriate based on predefined business rules, navigation events, or known user attributes.

Typical functionalities include:

- A testing and preview environment (sandboxing) to validate tag behavior before deployment
- Version control and change history (audit trail) to maintain accountability
- Tag deduplication and asynchronous loading to improve page performance
- Support for A/B testing, personalization, and consent management (especially for privacy compliance such as GDPR and CCPA)
- Role-based access control to manage user permissions and data visibility

These features help organizations improve data accuracy, reduce dependency on IT teams, and maintain compliance with evolving data protection regulations.

== Notable providers ==
According to a W3Techs survey, as of November 2023, Google Tag Manager constitutes 99.7% market share, followed by the Adobe DTM and Tealium with 0.4% and 0.2% market share respectively.
