= Verus Pharmaceuticals =

American pharmaceutical company

- Type: Private
- Industry: Pharmaceuticals
- Founded: November 2002
- Headquarters: San Diego, California, United States
- Key people: Cam L. Garner, chairman & CEO; Robert W. Keith, President & COO
- Products: Twinject
- Website: www.veruspharm.com

Verus Pharmaceuticals was a privately held pharmaceutical company based in San Diego, California, United States. It was founded in November 2002 by three former Dura Pharmaceuticals executives, Bob Keith, Peter Schineller and Cam Garner, with an initial focus on the treatment of asthma, allergies and related diseases and conditions, specifically in children. Verus is best known for its development and manufacturing of Twinject, the first (and currently only) two-dose epinephrine autoinjector.

== Company History ==
Verus developed and manufactured the Twinject two-dose epinephrine autoinjector.

The Twinject was later licensed to Paladin Labs for manufacturing and distribution in Canada (released in September 2006). The licence for manufacturing and distribution in Europe (and option for worldwide distribution) was sold to UCB. Twinject is available in two dosages (0.3 mg and 0.15 mg).

Verus Pharmaceuticals was dissolved in March 2008 after selling its Twinject product to Sciele Pharma for $29 million.

In 2009, Verus filed a lawsuit against AstraZeneca and Tika Lakemedel, "seeking $1.3 billion on claims of fraud, breach of contract, and conversion."

== See also ==
- List of companies headquartered in San Diego, California
- Pharmaceutical company
- Twinject
