= Beyond Dark Castle =

1987 computer game

- Developer: Silicon Beach Software
- Publishers: Silicon Beach Software; Activision
- Designer: Mark Stephen Pierce
- Programmer: Jonathan Gay
- Platforms: Macintosh, Amiga, Commodore 64,
- Release: 1987: Mac; 1989: C64, Amiga
- Genre: Platform
- Mode: Single-player

Beyond Dark Castle is a computer game, released for Macintosh in 1987 by Silicon Beach Software. It was designed by Mark Stephen Pierce and programmed by Jonathan Gay. It is the sequel to Dark Castle, with more levels, monsters and items, as well as a larger game map and longer levels. A second sequel, Return to Dark Castle, was released in 2008.

Activision published ports for the Commodore 64 and the Amiga.

== Plot ==
The game starts off with the end of Dark Castle, where Prince Duncan toppled the Black Knight's throne. In the original version, after toppling the throne, the Black Knight stands up shaking his fist, and a gargoyle drops Duncan in Trouble 3. In the newer version by Delta Tao Software, Color Dark Castle, after defeating the Black Knight on advanced, the Black Knight's throne falls down, off the bottom of the screen, and Duncan does a victory dance as it fades out.

When starting a new game in Beyond Dark Castle, the player sees Duncan approaching a fireplace and mantle. Duncan attempts to remove a nearby torch from the wall, only to have the whole wall turn around like a trapdoor. Duncan finds himself in a large anteroom, where there are five pedestals. Over the course of the game, the player collects five orbs to fill these pedestals, opening a gate that leads to the final duel with the Black Knight.

== Gameplay ==
Beyond Dark Castle is much more difficult than Dark Castle. A helicopter backpack has been added and Duncan can now collect and drop bombs. These can be used to destroy snakes, rats, and even walls. There is now a health meter that needs to be replenished, multiple keys can be collected, and the levels now scroll (horizontally and vertically). Games can also be saved and loaded (using a unique "computer room"), and there is also a practice mode.

While in Dark Castle the Black Knight's chambers could be entered at any time, Beyond Dark Castle requires Duncan to collect five orbs which are scattered around the new, much larger castle. As before, the Fireball and Shield must also be acquired before the assault on the Black Knight himself.

=== Levels ===
The game has 15 levels, like the first game, which came out of the 5 doors in the Great Hall.

1. Ye Roof: Computer Room, Clock Tower, Swamp, Forrest
2. West Tower: West Tower Wall, West Labyrinth, West Tower Top
3. East Tower: Black Knight's Brewery, East Labyrinth, East Tower Top
4. Underground: Basement, Catacombs, Dungeon
5. Main Hall: Ante Room, Black Knight's Showdown & The Final Battle

== Reception ==
Computer Gaming World said that Beyond Dark Castle was superior to its predecessor, approving of the new save and practice options. While very successful—ranking in the top five on Macworld list of bestselling Macintosh entertainment software 21 times—it was Silicon Beach's last game, as productivity software like SuperPaint was much more lucrative.

== Legacy ==
A colorized Mac version was planned by Delta Tao Software but dropped.

A version of Dark Castle was made for cellphones, which borrows some level designs from this game.

Return to Dark Castle, the sequel, contains all the levels from Beyond Dark Castle, as well as many new ones.
