= Daily Emerald =

Student-run weekly newspaper in the U.S.

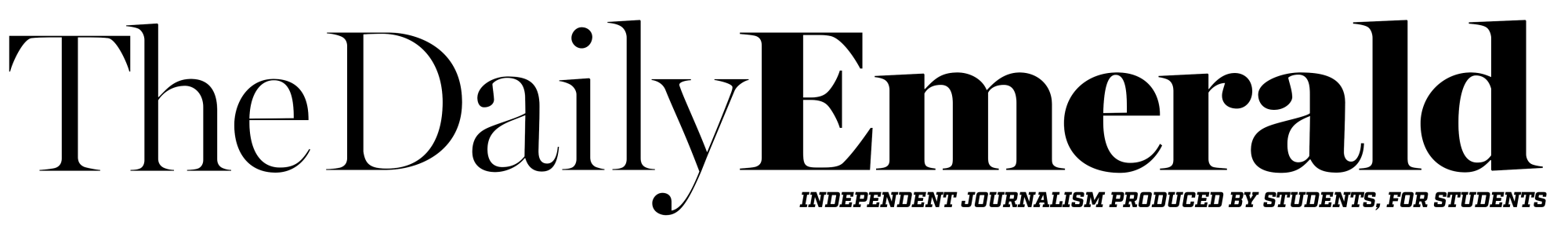

- Oregon Daily Emerald, February 18, 2011
- Type: Student newspaper
- Owner: Emerald Media Group
- Publisher: Eric Henry
- Editor-in-chief: Eva Andrews
- Founded: 1899
- Headquarters: Eugene, Oregon
- Circulation: 2,500 (as of 2023)
- ISSN: 0030-4662 (print); 2996-0657 (web)
- OCLC number: 704987467
- Website: dailyemerald.com

The Daily Emerald is the independent, student-run weekly newspaper produced at the University of Oregon in Eugene, Oregon, United States. The newspaper has served as a significant platform for student activism and investigative reporting over the years. Student engagement and campus culture has also been shaped because of the academic research the newspaper played regarding controversial issues at the University of Oregon. Its predecessor, the Oregon Daily Emerald newspaper, founded in 1899, trained many prominent writers and journalists and made important contributions to journalism case law. Currently, the Daily Emerald publishes a weekly newspaper on Mondays and covers local and campus news including university government, student affairs, athletics, and other issues affecting the Eugene community.

== Publishing ==
The Daily Emerald and associated publications, including the quarterly magazine Ethos, are published by the Emerald Media Group. The Emerald operates quasi-independently of the university with offices in Suite 302 and 305 of the Erb Memorial Union. They employ stent reporters, editors, photographers, and multimedia producers every academic year to keep the newspaper running.

== History ==
=== Origins ===
The Emerald traces its roots to the University of Oregon Monthly, a literary magazine launched in 1897. This newspaper, first started in 1899, publishing twice a week as the Oregon Weekly, and in 1920, it began to publish five days a week as the Oregon Emerald. In the early twentieth century, they transitioned back to publishing weekly on Mondays as the Daily Emerald. The name "Emerald" was selected as a tip of the cap to poet Joaquin Miller, who referred to Oregon as "the Emerald state" in several of his works. Since green was one of the University's school colors, the connection was made and the name adopted.

The Oregon Emerald was initially sold by subscription, with a full year priced at $1.00 and individual copies sold for 5 cents each, reflecting its role as a student-led publication accessible to the university community.

=== State v. Buchanan ===
On May 24, 1966, the Emerald ran a story, "Students Condone Marijuana Use," by author Annette Buchanan, which included seven unnamed sources discussing their drug use. The interviews were granted under the condition that the sources' names would not be revealed. After reading Buchanan's story, local law enforcement officials convened a grand jury investigation into the illegal use of drugs.

On June 1, 1966, the Lane County District Attorney subpoenas Buchanan, requesting names of sources. Buchanan refused and was fined $300 for contempt of court. The case went through the court system until the Oregon Supreme Court dismissed Buchanan's claim that the Oregon Constitution protected her. In 1968 the U.S. Supreme Court refused to grant certiorari.

Subsequently, the Oregon Legislative Assembly passed a journalistic shield law (ORS 44.510 through 44.540). The Oregon Shield Law provides extensive protection for all members of the news and information media. The statute provides absolute protection from compelled disclosure of both sources and all information obtained by journalists in the course of their work. It is not clear whether the journalist must have promised confidentiality for the source of information to be covered by the law. The only exceptions to the Oregon statute exist where: (1) there is probable cause to believe that the journalist has or is about to commit a crime or (2) where the defendant in a defamation suit has asserted a defense based on the content or source of the information.

=== Fire this…FUCK CENSORSHIP ===
On Oct. 1, 2007, the Emerald's Monday print edition had its second page swapped with The Daily Barometer — the student newspaper at Oregon State University. Somehow, The Daily Barometer's second page had ended up in both papers. Kathy Carbone, the paper's business manager at the time, said the printer claimed the swap was accidental, but she believes it was on purpose and said the paper's staff considered it an act of censorship.

The Daily Emerald's second page featured in an opinion piece written by the Emerald's editorial board with the headline “Fire this…FUCK CENSORSHIP.” The last half of the title was written in big, bold letters across the page. The article was in response to Colorado State University authorities discussing whether to fire Rocky Mountain Collegian editor-in-chief David McSwane over a published four worded article in the paper that read “Tase this… FUCK BUSH”. The article was in response to the University of Florida Taser incident.

The Daily Emerald's article ended up being published in the paper the following day on Oct. 2, 2007. The paper received some backlash for the article from members of the local community. On Oct.17, 2007, the Daily Emerald published a letter to the editor written by Eugene, Oregon resident Lisa Priaulx. In her letter, titled "Profane headline makes Emerald look immature and unprofessional ", she writes in opposition of the headline.

At The Daily Emerald's end-of-year celebration, the paper's staff presented editor-in-chief Laura Powers with a framed copy of the “Fire this…FUCK CENSORSHIP” page.

=== Newsroom strike ===
On March 3, 2009, following a management dispute between student staffers and the paper's board of directors, newsroom members at the Oregon Daily Emerald decided to strike, citing board actions as threatening to the independence of the Emerald. They issued four demands to the board at its scheduled executive session on March 3, and printed an editorial in the paper the following day that also contained the requests. The demands were as follows:

1. Immediately rescind the offer to Steven A. Smith to serve as interim publisher April 1, 2009 through June 30, 2010.
2. Conduct a nationwide search for a publisher, as originally voted at the February 10 board meeting.
3. Stipulate in the chosen publisher's contract that he or she shall not be employed in any capacity by the university, including at the School of Journalism and Communication.
4. Stipulate in the chosen publisher's contract that he or she shall not have immediate supervisory control over the editor; rather, the publisher and student editor shall remain equals in the organization, as the general manager and student editor currently are.

On March 4, 2009, Steven Smith announced his intention to "withdraw from the fray" following notification of the student strike. The Board of Directors later stated their intention to conduct a nationwide search. The Oregon Daily Emerald published a newspaper on the morning of March 5, 2009, without the contributions of the newsroom staff. A flurry of media coverage on the strike ensued throughout the day. Following statements of support for the strikers by the Associated Students of the University of Oregon, community members and other student publications around the United States, the board of directors and the newsroom staff agreed to engage in a mediation process the following week to fully resolve the situation. The newsroom staff agreed to end the strike and resume publishing the newspaper on March 9, 2009.

== Awards and Recognitions ==
The Daily Emerald has received national and regional journalism awards, including the Associated Collegiate Press Pacemaker Award, often referred to as the Pulitzer Prize of collegiate journalism. The paper has won a Pacemaker multiple times, including in 1938, 1997, 2009, 2016, and 2024. These awards are often regarded as the highest recognition in collegiate journalism. The publication has also received awards from the Oregon Newspaper Publishers Association for reporting, deign, and multimedia journalism.

== Going digital ==
In fall 2012, the Oregon Daily Emerald Publishing Company, Inc. transitioned to a new entity, the Emerald Media Group. Today, the Daily Emerald publishes a weekly print newspaper as well as online, as well as publishing multimedia, such as video and podcasts through their website. Additionally, the Daily Emerald's issues from 1909-1952 have been digitized as an effort to provide online access for research and public use. These archives have contributed to student journalism and media history.

== Notable editors ==
Former staff members have gone on to careers in professional journalism and media industries, becoming part of national and regional news organizations.

- Richard L. Neuberger 1932–33, journalist, author, and Senator
- Paul Brainerd 1969–70, PageMaker and desktop publishing creator, Aldus Corporation founder
- Grattan Kerans 1970–71, Oregon State Legislator

== Notable former staff members ==
- Randy Shilts, author, And the Band Played On
