= Strategic Conquest Plus =

1986 video game

- Publisher(s): PBI Software
- Platform(s): Apple II
- Release: 1986
- Genre(s): Strategy

Strategic Conquest Plus is a 1986 video game published by PBI Software.

== Gameplay ==
Strategic Conquest Plus is a game in which features and enhancements to Strategic Conquest include the option for automated moves, an automatic save game function, digitized sound and networking support from AppleTalk. The game takes place on a 60-by-100 foot square map, and the player wins by conquering the world. Players may compete against each other or against computer opponents of up to 15 skill levels. Each player begins the game in their home city and must begin building armies, exploring the world and capturing other cities which can produce new war machines.

== Development and release ==
Strategic Conquest Plus was released in 1986. In later documents this is generally referred to Strategic Conquest 2.0. The Apple II version of 1.0 shipped the same year, and the Plus version the next year.

== Reception ==
William H. Harrington reviewed the game for Computer Gaming World, and stated that "Strategic Conquest Plus is one of those rare games that the author seems committed to improving. With a host of innovative new features and the ability to withstand a billion or so replays, SC+ is certainly worth taking a look at. Just keep the sound down if the boss is around."

James D. Hornfischer for MacUser said that "With this wonderfully playable yet intricate program, PBI has superseded the tired genres of shoot-'em-up arcade spiels and rigidly structured text adventures."

David Langendoen for Home Office Computing rating the game at 4 stars for overall performance, and said that the game was "a strong enough game to overcome [its] handicaps and come out smelling like silicon roses".

Byte named it the game of the month for May 1987, and runner-up for game of the year of 1987.
