= Dark Castle =

1986 video game

- Developers: Silicon Beach Software; Artech Studios (Genesis)
- Publisher: Electronic Arts (Genesis)
- Designers: Mark Stephen Pierce; Jonathan Gay
- Platforms: Mac OS, Amiga, Atari ST, Commodore 64, MS-DOS, Apple IIGS, Genesis, CD-i
- Release: List: Mac OS; WW: 1986 Amiga, Atari ST, Commodore 64, MS-DOS; WW: 1987 Apple IIGS; WW: 1989 Sega Genesis; WW: 1991 CD-i; WW: 1992
- Genre: Platform
- Mode: Single-player

Dark Castle is a 1986 platform game for Macintosh, originally published by Silicon Beach Software. The game was designed and animated by Mark Pierce and programmed by Jonathan Gay, with Real Sound provided by Eric Zocher. In Dark Castle, a young hero named Duncan attempts to reach the evil Black Knight while dodging various objects and solving occasional puzzles.

A sequel, Beyond Dark Castle, was released in 1987. A second sequel, Return to Dark Castle, was developed by Super Happy Fun Fun, Inc. and released on the Mac App Store on March 14, 2008.

Ports to other platforms were also published by Three-Sixty Pacific and Electronic Arts for the SEGA Genesis. The series has sold over 1 million copies.

== Plot ==
When the evil Black Knight terrorizes the townspeople, Prince Duncan resolves to overthrow him. To accomplish this, he must navigate the four sections of the castle: Fireball, Shield, Trouble, and Black Knight.

After collecting the Fireball and Shield, Duncan proceeds to the Black Knight's throne room, where he topples the Black Knight's throne. The Black Knight then stands, shaking his fist, as a gargoyle carries Duncan to Trouble 3.

== Gameplay ==
Though released in 1986 with black-and-white graphics, the Mac version of Dark Castle featured detailed graphics, animated enemies, climbable ropes, and walkable ledges.

The game begins with a vista of the castle set against a backdrop of storm clouds in the distance. The opening notes of Bach's Toccata and Fugue in D minor play, accompanied by thunderclaps. The title, along with the programming and development credits, is shown on this screen.

Movement within Dark Castle is typical for most platformers. Duncan can run, jump, and duck, and he can throw a limited supply of rocks at his enemies. More rocks can be found in small bags along the way, as well as bottles of an elixir that provide a one-time antidote to bites from the many rats and bats encountered throughout the castle.

To defeat the Black Knight, Duncan must pull several levers that topple him from his throne. To aid Duncan, a magic shield and the ability to hurl fireballs can be found within the Dark Castle. The game begins in the Great Hall, where the player can choose from four doors. The large center door leads to the Black Knight. One other door is marked with the shield, while the remaining two alternate mysteriously between the fireball course and a more troublesome path. The game can be played on three different skill levels, with the hardest "Advanced" level featuring more enemies and additional surprises.

Dark Castle may be the first game to use the WASD keys and mouse for control. The trajectory and launching of rocks and fireballs are controlled via mouse movement and clicks, respectively, while the character's movement is managed through keystrokes.

Duncan can easily become disoriented; when walking into a wall or falling a short distance without jumping, he will circle around for a moment, mumbling incoherently. He is highly vulnerable to attacks during this time.

Falling into holes in the floor does not result in death, but instead leads to a dungeon ("Trouble 3"), from which escape requires some effort. On easier difficulty levels, this results in a delay. However, this may be strategically necessary on the harder difficulty levels, allowing the player to stock up on rocks and elixirs.

=== Levels ===
Dark Castle features 14 levels, accessed through the four doors in the Great Hall, with the first two doors being random.

- Leftmost door (usually): Trouble 1, Trouble 2, Trouble 3.
- Further door on the left side (usually): Fireball 1, Fireball 2, Fireball 3, Fireball 4.
- Middle door: Black Knight 1, Black Knight 2, Black Knight 3.
- Right door: Shield 1, Shield 2, Shield 3, Shield 4.

== Development ==
Mark Pierce was based in San Francisco with his own company, MacroMind, while Jon Gay and the rest of the Silicon Beach team were located in San Diego. After an initial launch meeting, most of the collaboration between Pierce and Gay was conducted remotely. Pierce designed the animations using MacroMind's "VideoWorks" (the direct predecessor of Adobe Director) and then mailed the files on floppy disks to Gay, who coded the game in 68000 Assembly Language on an Apple Lisa. A few components, such as the high-score system, were written in Pascal. The digitized sound was created by Eric Zocher, who worked with voice actor Dick Noel.

Silicon Beach advertised Dark Castle as being "arcade quality on your Mac".

== Ports and remakes ==
16-color Atari ST version

Versions for the Amiga, Atari ST, and Commodore 64 were released in 1987 by Three-Sixty Pacific. The Apple IIGS version, released in 1989, was programmed by Lane Roathe and was nearly identical to the Macintosh version, differing only in resolution, color graphics, and some controls. John Romero converted the monochrome Macintosh art to 16-color super-res art.

An MS-DOS version of Dark Castle was also released, which was closer to the original game. Due to the lower resolution, color was used to compensate. Additionally, since the PC did not have a mouse at the time, aiming was accomplished through the keyboard. There is some controversy regarding the colors, owing to the nature of the coloring.

A version for the Sega Genesis was released by Electronic Arts in 1991.

A version for mobile was released in 2006. Developed by Super Happy Fun Fun, which included one of the original developers, Mark Stephen Pierce, it was published by Bandai. This version features slightly remade level designs, borrowing elements from both Dark Castle and Beyond Dark Castle, as well as updated color graphics.

There was also a version released for CD-i. As of 2009, a port was in development for iOS.

A version of the game was released on Steam on August 18, 2026.

=== Color Dark Castle ===
In 1994, the game developer Delta Tao Software acquired the rights to several of Silicon Beach's old games from Aldus, enabling them to produce and publish the modernized Color Dark Castle.

The new version featured full-color graphics and made several changes, such as replacing the Water from fireball 2 and 3 with Lava. This version also introduced a new difficulty setting that let players skip to the end destination from any door in the Great Hall (e.g., from the Great Hall to Fireball 4), resulting in fewer enemies and easier gameplay. Additionally, there is a save feature that permits the game to be saved in the Great Hall, though only one game can be saved at a time.

== Reception ==
Computer Gaming World stated that Dark Castle was "the best arcade game I've seen for the Macintosh, and perhaps the best I've seen on any microcomputer, ever." The reviewer praised the sound and graphics, noting that he did not know the Macintosh was capable of animations of such quality. He said Dark Castle "is filled with lots of little touches that show it's one of the first steps toward what Silicon Beach likes to call 'interactive cartoons'." BYTE compared the game to Lode Runner, writing, "There's nothing new about the basic concept, but the execution is impressive." The magazine praised its "slick animation and realistic digitized sound," concluding that it "is a perfect way to fritter away those long winter evenings when you should be doing something productive." Compute! praised the Amiga version's "brilliant graphics, sound, and atmosphere" but criticized the keyboard/mouse control system and gameplay as too difficult. The reviewer also expressed concern about the disk-based copy protection, which caused him to fear damage to the disk drives, crashes when loading the game, and slow level loading.

Game reviewers Hartley and Pattie Lesser complimented the game in their "The Role of Computers" column in Dragon #122 (1987), calling it "the finest arcade/adventure game ever designed for the Macintosh computer — as a matter of fact, for any computer!" They further stated, "The graphics and animation are quite literally stunning!" In a subsequent column, they gave the game 4 out of 5 stars. Macworld reviewed the Macintosh version of Dark Castle, praising its gameplay, graphics, and sound. The magazine stated, "Dark Castle is at its core a shoot-'em-up, duck-'n'-run type of game, but one so finely crafted it deserves a new classification that reflects its fast-paced action as well as its superb animation, graphics, and sound. The game has a humorous aspect as well," and furthermore noted "Dark Castle provides the highest quality graphics and sound of any Macintosh game available. Its action is fast and furious, its scripting sublime." Macworld summarized their review by listing the game's pros and cons, noting "Great graphics, sound, animation, and design" as positives and stating "None" for Dark Castle's negatives. Power Unlimited gave the CD-i version a score of 72%, summarizing: "The CD-I can be much nicer than demonstrated in this game. Fortunately, the game is fun once you get the hang of it. It is exciting and varied, but unfortunately the service is disappointing."

In 1996, Computer Gaming World declared Dark Castle the 136th-best computer game ever released.

== Legacy ==
=== Beyond Dark Castle ===
In 1987, the sequel Beyond Dark Castle was released, in which Duncan must return to defeat the Black Knight, who is still alive. To access the Black Knight's tower, the player must first gather five magic orbs, which are placed in various hard-to-reach locations. The orbs must then be returned to the Ante Chamber and placed on five pedestals for the gate to open, allowing Duncan to confront the Black Knight.

Beyond Dark Castle featured an engine similar to that of Dark Castle, but with improvements and additions, such as a health bar, bombs, and other items. It also introduced levels where the player could control a "personal helicopter." These levels and maze levels were designed as side-scrollers rather than being limited to a single screen. Players could also save their progress in a "computer room" level. As with all versions of Dark Castle, if the player completed the game on the advanced difficulty, they were presented with a special ending.

=== Return to Dark Castle ===
In 2000, a new sequel titled Return to Dark Castle was announced, developed by Z Sculpt. In this installment, a young hero named Bryant, who is the nephew of Duncan, must once again defeat the Black Knight. The game was not released until March 14, 2008.

Return to Dark Castle introduced new gameplay mechanics, such as the ability for players to keep weapons and store extra orbs in a designated room. Although it was initially stated that the game would have a level editor allowing players to create custom quests, this feature was not included in the download. According to the game's official website at Super Happy Fun Fun, the "level editor will be released soon."
