= Jerry Overton =

American football player (born 1941)

No. 20
- Position: Safety

Personal information
- Born: January 24, 1941 (age 85); El Dorado Springs, Missouri, U.S.
- Listed height: 6 ft 2 in (1.88 m)
- Listed weight: 190 lb (86 kg)

Career information
- High school: Mar Vista (Imperial Beach, California)
- College: Utah (1959–1962)
- NFL draft: 1963: 15th round, 202nd overall pick

Career history
- Dallas Cowboys (1963–1964)

Career NFL statistics
- Games played: 10
- Stats at Pro Football Reference

Jerry Lee Overton (born January 24, 1941) is an American former professional football player who was a safety for the Dallas Cowboys of the National Football League (NFL). He played college football for the Utah Utes.

== Early life ==
Overton attended Mar Vista High School in Imperial Beach, California, where he was an all-Avocado League selection in three sports: football, basketball, and track and field. He was the 1958 Avocado League player of the year in football and was the senior class president. He accepted a football scholarship from the University of Utah.

== College career ==
Overton played on the freshman team during his first year at Utah. As a sophomore, he registered 10 receptions (second on the team) for 193 yards (third on the team), a 19.3-yard average (second on the team), 2 receiving touchdowns (tied for the team lead) and 30 carries for 119 yards.

As a junior, he tallied 7 receptions (third on the team) for 80 yards (third on the team), one receiving touchdown, 27 carries for 158 yards (5.9-yard average) and 2 rushing touchdowns. He ranked 18th in the nation in kickoff returns, with a 30-yard average.

As a senior, he was limited with injuries, posting 18 receptions for 190 yards, one receiving touchdown and 36 carries for 182 yards (5.1-yard average). He was selected to play in the 1963 Senior Bowl.

== Professional career ==
Overton was selected by the Dallas Cowboys in the 15th round (202nd overall) of the 1963 NFL draft. As a rookie, he was tried at flanker, before being moved to safety. In 1964, he was placed on the injured reserve list with a broken leg he suffered in a skiing accident . He couldn't recover his previous form and was released on August 13, 1965.

== Personal life ==
In 1961, Overton married Diane Carol Chase, a Casper, Wyoming, native and fellow sophomore at the University of Utah.
