= The Lot (cinema) =

Movie theater chain in California

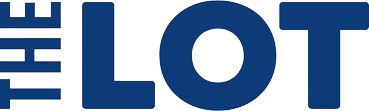

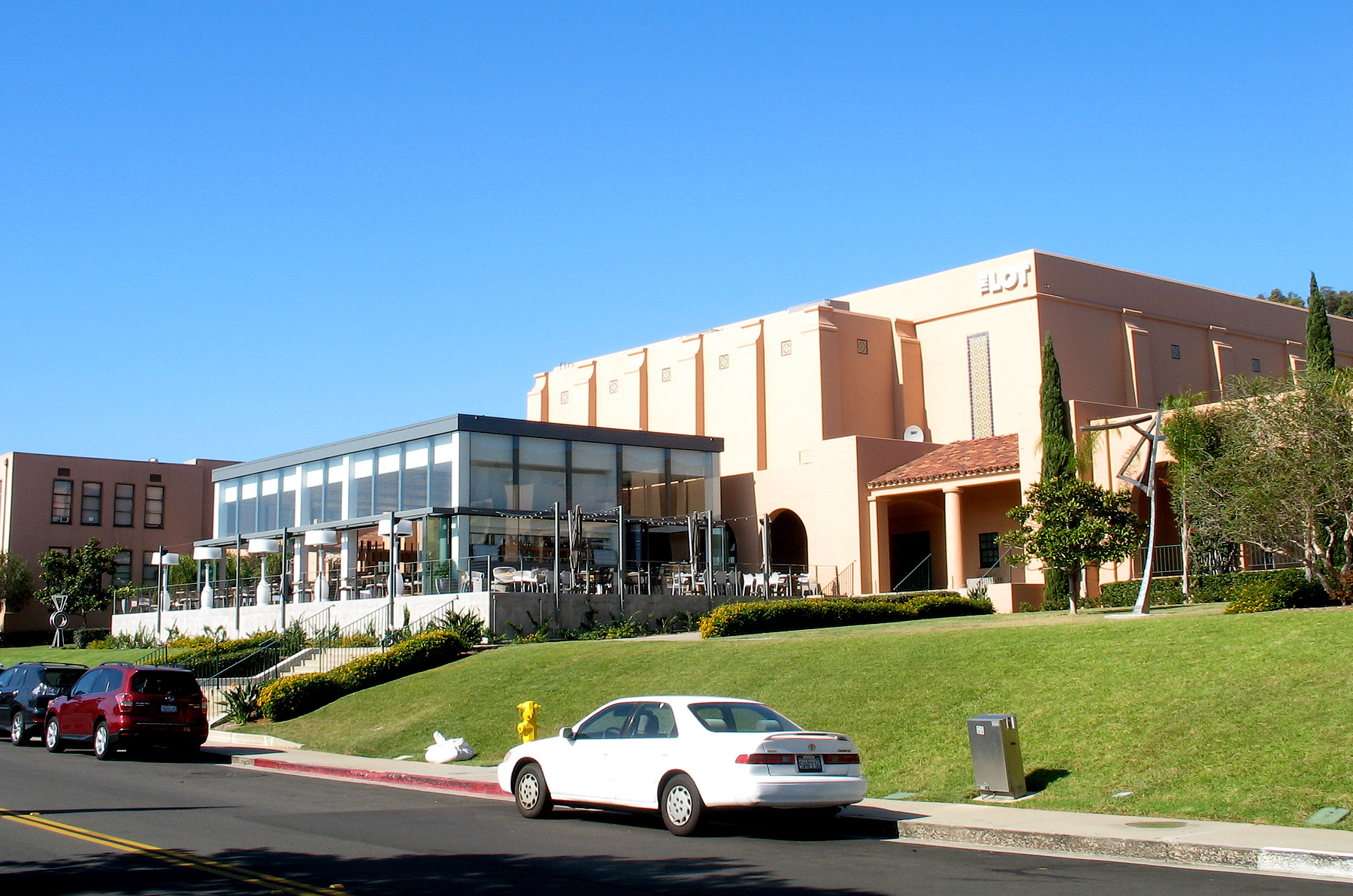
- The Lot theater at Liberty Station, San Diego
- Type: Private
- Industry: Cinema
- Founded: 2015; 11 years ago in La Jolla, California, U.S.
- Founder: Adolfo Fastlicht
- Number of locations: 5
- Area served: California
- Website: thelotent.com

The Lot, stylized as THE LOT, is an American luxury movie theater chain headquartered in La Jolla, California. Founded in 2015, the company operates primarily in Southern California as well as one location in Northern California. The chain's theater complexes are adjoined by sit-down restaurants, bars, and cafes.

== History ==
The Lot was founded in 2015 in La Jolla, California, a community in San Diego. It was founded by Adolfo Fastlicht, a cinema proprietor who previously co-founded Cinemex. The company's name is a shortening of the word "backlot". The first location, a seven-screen multiplex located on Fay Avenue in La Jolla, cost US$18,000,000 to construct and opened on September 30, 2015.

On May 5, 2016, The Lot opened its second location in the Luce Auditorium, a former United States Navy facility at Liberty Station in San Diego. The former 2,200-seat auditorium was divided into six smaller auditoriums. Several parts of the historic theater, such as the original wood stage flooring and the proscenium arch, were preserved and incorporated into the lobby.

On April 26, 2018, The Lot opened its third location and first outside of San Diego County, a seven-screen complex at the Fashion Island mall in Newport Beach, California. On November 8, 2018, the company's fourth location was opened in San Ramon, California, as an inaugural tenant of the Bishop Ranch mall.

In 2024, the restaurant of the historic La Jolla location was overhauled to redefine the company as an "entertainment establishment that houses a theater."

The Palisades Village in 2026 with the Bay Theater marquee

In October 2026, it was announced that in partnership with Paramount Pictures, The LOT would be opening a fifth location in the Pacific Palisades Bay Theater, which had remained shuttered since a wildfire. The Bay Theater reopened under this operation on November 13, 2026.

== See also ==
- List of companies headquartered in San Diego
