= Clan Lord =

1998 video game

- Developer: Delta Tao Software
- Publisher: Delta Tao Software
- Platforms: Mac OS, Mac OS X, Microsoft Windows
- Release: 18 October 1998
- Genre: MMORPG
- Mode: Multiplayer

Clan Lord is the Macintosh's first massively multiplayer online role-playing game (MMORPG), made by Delta Tao Software. It was started in the late 1990s and is still going, with a regular update every 4 weeks. There is also a client for Windows. In 2001 it was voted one of the top ten Mac games of all time in GAMES Magazine. By the end of 2007, player participation dropped below 100 concurrently online. The game world and characters' options in it grow with each update. The game encourages cooperation and community and has only minimal opportunities for player-vs.-player (PvP) activity. On January 17, 2009, it was announced that Delta Tao would no longer charge monthly fees for play. Since then player numbers have increased from the previous low player base and it maintains a steady stream of online players.

As of 2006, there are Windows and Java ports maintained by the Arindal development team. The Windows client is also running under Linux using Wine.

== Setting ==
Game characters have been exiled by the mad Emperor Mobius to the Lok'Groton Islands for "crimes" against the Empire. Characters are of seven races: Human, Dwarf, Sylvan, Halfling, Thoom, Ghorak Zo, and The People. Exiles may choose to pursue one of three classes: Fighter, Healer, or Mystic, and may also choose sub-classes for the Fighter class: Ranger, Champion or Blood-Mage. In addition to the dangers of the natural island wildlife, exiles must deal with other sentient beings, including the warlike Orgas, the Darshak pirates, the Undine (i.e., undead), and a group of ancient and powerful sorcerers.

== Game mechanics ==
Clan Lord's battle system is primarily based on character skill choices, rather than the items equipped by the character. Items are used more for cosmetic purposes (clothing) and access to additional abilities (e.g. a chain to drag fallen exiles to safety). Clan Lord does not have a level system with multiple skill improvements per level. Rather, skills are trained one at a time in small increments known as ranks. It is not uncommon for exiles to have thousands of ranks. Communication occurs through speech bubbles near an exile's sprite, with options for talking, yelling, thought bubbles, whispering, and performing actions. A sunstone will allow the user to send messages directly to other exiles.

=== Status bars ===
There are three quantities determining an exile's status: health, balance, and spirit, tracked through bars in the interface. The total quantity and rate of recovery of each of these can be trained by certain classes through training. Health is decreased by taking damage, and restored through healing. When the health bar is empty, the exile falls, and cannot move or fight until healed, or giving up and returning to town through Purgatory with a loss of experience. Balance is used when attacking an enemy. Spirit is used by the Healer class when healing self or others, and by the Mystic class and sub-classed Fighters for many of their respective abilities. Balance and spirit continually recharge.

=== Fighting ===
Clan Lord's fighting system operates on a simple bump-to-attack system. Played in third-person view, the player moves or clicks the mouse in the direction he or she wants the exile to move. When running into an enemy, the exile will swing a weapon, if one is equipped. All classes can do this; however, those in the Fighter class have many more training options, and more powerful training options, than Healers and Mystics. This fighting system trades complexity for control, with strategy arising from the precise control the player has over the exile's movements. Choosing a Fighter sub-class adds skills which can be used during battle.

=== Healing ===
Self-healing abilities in Clan Lord are limited. Instead, those of the Healer class work to keep a group of exiles alive throughout a hunt or to repel invaders. Healers start with a moonstone, an item that heals when bumping into an exile, and can be used to self-heal. Later, Healers can gain ranged healing items and abilities. Healing other exiles decreases the Healer's health and spirit, though the health decrease is less than what is gained by the other exile. Healers can also train in the ability to be healed particularly quickly by other Healers, allowing a pair or team of Healers to soak up large amounts of damage without falling.

=== Mystics ===
Many of the abilities of mystics are intentionally shrouded in secrecy. However, there is some information that is easily seen by all. Mystics can give exiles near them a temporary boost in the ability to hit enemies with a Rod of Akea, or amount of balance with a Rod of Ballou. They can locate exiles with a Skristal, most often used to find fallen exiles who can then be rescued. They can also provide sunstone creation and repair services.
