= Paul Brainerd =

American businessman and computer programmer (1947–2026)

Paul Steven Brainerd
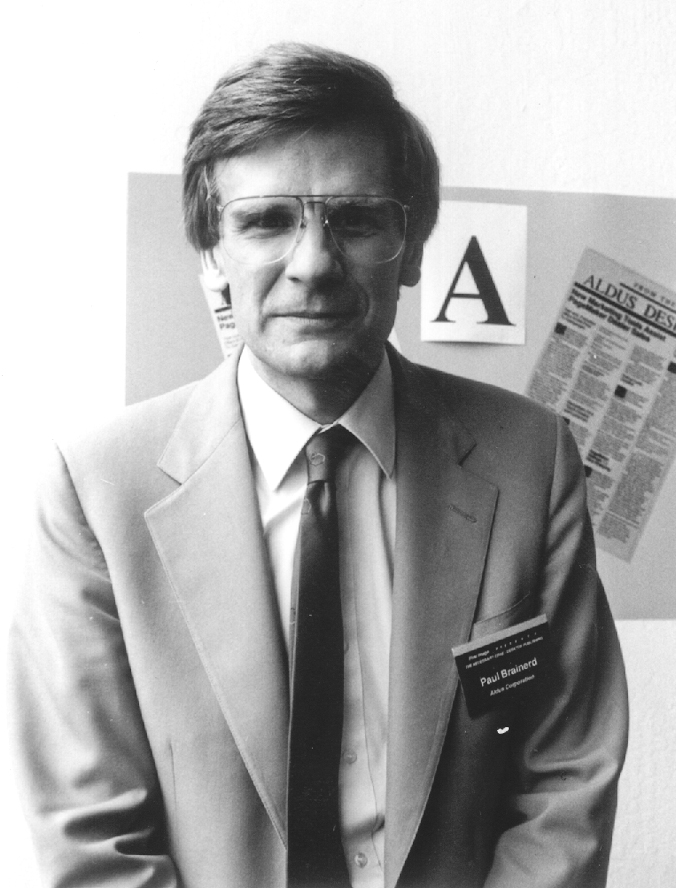
- Brainerd in 1986
- Born: Paul Steven Brainerd; November 17, 1947; Medford, Oregon, U.S.
- Died: February 15, 2026 (aged 78); Bainbridge Island, Washington, U.S.
- Occupations: Businessman; computer programmer; software publisher; philanthropist

Paul Steven Brainerd (November 17, 1947 – February 15, 2026) was an American businessman, computer programmer and philanthropist. In 1984, he co-founded the Aldus Corporation, which released PageMaker, the first consumer-use desktop publishing software. Brainerd coined the term "desktop publishing". From 1995 on, he was involved in philanthropic efforts, including the founding of Social Ventures Partners in 1997, a global organization that connects local investors with non-profit community organizations.

== Background ==
Brainerd was born in Medford, Oregon, to Phillip and Leta VerNetta (née Swarstley) Brainerd. He attended the University of Oregon, where he received his B.A.in business administration and was the editor for the school's paper, the Oregon Daily Emerald. Following graduation, he worked at the Minneapolis Star-Tribune. He received an M.S. in journalism from the University of Minnesota.

Brainerd died at his home on Bainbridge Island, Washington, on February 15, 2026, at the age of 78.

== Desktop publishing ==
Brainerd co-founded the publishing/printing software company Aldus in 1984. The company subsequently brought PageMaker to the market. Brainerd is also known for having coined the term "desktop publishing". He stepped down from his position of president and chief executive of Aldus in 1993, ten years after its founding.

== Philanthropy ==
In 1995, Brainerd founded the Brainerd Foundation, a small family foundation that provides innovative grantmaking to Pacific Northwest communities and nonprofits to build a lasting conservation ethic at the local, state, and federal level.

Brainerd founded Social Ventures Partners (SVP) in 1997. The organization works by matching philanthropists, who provide funding and mentorship, with local community organizations. By 2017, the organization consisted of 3,500 venture philanthropists in 43 cities and nine countries. The group's collective investments total more than $63 million in over 800 organizations.

In 2000, Paul Brainerd founded Islandwood, an environmental learning center created to improve access to meaningful, nature-based learning experiences for the region's children. The center is located on Bainbridge Island, Washington.

In 2018, Brainerd founded Camp Glenorchy, an accommodation provider that operates in Glenorchy, New Zealand. Camp Glenorchy is designed, built, engineered and operated in line with the philosophy and principles of the Living Building Challenge, a sustainability standard for buildings. The establishment of the camp was controversial with the local community.

== Sources ==
- HistoryLink Essay: Paul Brainerd
- Brainerd Foundation
