= PressWise =

- Other names: ScenicSoft
- Developer: Aldus Prepress Group

PressWise was digital imposition software to quickly and easily impose most any variety of flat and folding layouts. It was acquired by the Aldus Prepress Group affectionately known in the print and publishing industry as the Aldus WiseGuys in August 1991 from Emulation Technologies Inc. of Cleveland, Ohio. It was further developed by the Aldus Press Group and launched as the first of many Aldus prepress products in 1993. It was subsequently owned by Adobe Systems, then Luminous Corporation (Seattle), then Imation, and finally ScenicSoft. PressWise was discontinued by ScenicSoft in 1999 ultimately.

== History ==
In February 2009, the PressWise copyright was acquired by Aethos Technologies and a new print automation product was launched by its creator, Eric Wold of Santa Rosa, California. This new product has no relationship to the old imposition software of the same name. It's notable that Larry Letteney, former President of Creo Americas was a board member and shareholder of Aethos Technologies during its early phase. Datatech SmartSoft acquired exclusive distribution rights to the software in September 2009. In September 2010 Datatech SmartSoft completed the acquisition of the PressWise brand and product.
