= Aldus Persuasion =

Discontinued presentation program

- Persuasion running under System 7.
- Other names: Adobe Persuasion (1995–1997)
- Original author: Peter Polash
- Developers: Aldus Corporation (1988–1995); Adobe Systems (1995–1997)
- Release: November 1988; 37 years ago
- Final release: 4.0 / 1996; 30 years ago
- Operating system: Classic Mac OS and Microsoft Windows
- Type: Presentation program
- License: Proprietary commercial software

Aldus Persuasion (later Adobe Persuasion) is a discontinued presentation program developed for the Macintosh platform by Aldus Corporation. After it was acquired by Adobe Systems in 1994, when the two companies merged, a Microsoft Windows version was released. Adobe discontinued production from September 1997.

A key feature of Persuasion, which distinguished it from Microsoft PowerPoint at the time, was the use of an outline to represent the text content of the slides, which was immediately reflected on the slides (and vice versa). PowerPoint eventually provided an equivalent feature.

== Versions history ==
- Aldus Persuasion 1.0. Made for Macintosh only. Created by Peter Polash in 1988.
- Aldus Persuasion 2.0. Made for Macintosh in 1989 and for Windows in 1991.
- Aldus Persuasion 2.x
- Adobe Persuasion 3.0. Had both Mac and Windows versions, and was released in 1995. It was bundled with the Persuasion Player.
- Adobe Persuasion 4.0. Was released in 1996. The Mac and Windows versions shipped together, with a simultaneous end-user license for each platform. It was bundled with Adobe Acrobat Distiller 3.0, Acrobat Reader 3.0, Persuasion Player, Adobe Type Manager, and a collection of clip art, movies, sounds, and 20 fonts. It included a utility to directly convert Microsoft PowerPoint files.
