= VolleyHut.com =

- Type: Private
- Genre: Sports
- Founded: 1999
- Founder: Charlie Jackson
- Headquarters: San Diego, California, USA
- Website: www.VolleyHut.com

VolleyHut.com is an online retailer of volleyball products.

Established in 1999, VolleyHut is based in Poway, California and owned by Charlie Jackson.

Jackson was an early Macintosh software publisher who founded Silicon Beach Software and co-founded FutureWave Software, which created the original version of what is now Adobe Flash.

VolleyHut established the Beach Volleyball Junior Olympics as a stand-alone event, hosting it in 1999 in San Diego. Previously, the Beach Volleyball Junior Olympics had been held in conjunction with a pro beach volleyball event.

From 2000 to 2007, VolleyHut also assisted U.S. women players by sponsoring a team in the under-20 International Tournament held each year in Sibillini, Italy.
