= Cyberian Outpost =

Online vendor of discount computerware

Cyberian Outpost, Inc.
- Company type: Public
- Traded as: Nasdaq: COOL
- Industry: E-commerce
- Founded: 1995; 31 years ago
- Founder: Darryl Peck
- Defunct: 2001; 25 years ago
- Fate: Acquired
- Successor: Fry's Electronics
- Headquarters: Kent, Connecticut
- Products: Computer hardware & software
- Revenue: ▲$355 million (2001)
- Number of employees: 300

Cyberian Outpost, Inc. was an online vendor of discount computer hardware and software that operated the website outpost.com. After its IPO in 1998, it reached a peak market capitalization of $1 billion, but, after the bursting of the dot-com bubble, its stock price fell rapidly and the company was acquired by Fry's Electronics in 2001 for $21 million.

The company received publicity for its controversial advertisements including one in which gerbils were shot out of a cannon, one where wolves attack a high school marching band, and one where children in daycare are being tattooed with "outpost.com" on their foreheads.

== History ==
Cyberian Outpost was founded in 1995 by Darryl Peck.

Cyberian Outpost was one of the earliest successful online-only retailers. Unlike many large retailers of the time, the company marketed directly to expert consumers instead of businesses and specialized in hard-to-find Macintosh products in a market saturated with Microsoft-compatible products. Outpost.com marketed its products around the world and offered its website in 11 languages and sold to customers in 140 countries.

The company expanded rapidly, taking advantage of the booming Internet. Revenue increased from $1.9 million in the year ended February 29, 1996 to $22.7 million in the year ended February 28, 1998.

In 1997, Money Magazine rated the site as "Best Site for Computer Equipment". Outpost.com raised $2.7 million in venture capital in 1997, at which point the site had 25,000 visitors per day and 1.3 million customers. The company secured another $22 million in financing in 1998, and raised another $70 million from its initial public offering. Outpost.com opened a warehouse in Ohio that could guarantee next-morning domestic delivery and worldwide delivery within 48 hours. Outpost provided next-day shipping on all orders, regardless of size, up until 2001.

After the dot-com bubble burst, the company fell on hard times. In 2001, the company entered into a merger agreement with PC Connection but then terminated that merger agreement and the company was sold to Fry's Electronics for $21 million including the repayment of $13 million in debt from PC Connection. At that time, the company had 1.4 million customers and 4 million visitors per month to its website.

== Marketing ==
Outpost.com forged marketing partnerships with major Internet portals, such as AOL, CNet, and Lycos in which Outpost.com was featured on these websites.

Outpost.com hired Cliff Freeman to produce TV ads. His agency had created the "Pizza Pizza" campaign for Little Caesars and the "Where's the Beef?" campaigns for Wendy's International. Outpost.com adopted a zealous and controversial marketing program which included a Super Bowl ad in which fake gerbils were shot out of a cannon at the company logo, followed later by an ad that featured a high school marching band being attacked by a pack of ravenous wolves, and another ad portraying pre-school toddlers being tattooed with 'Outpost.com' across their foreheads.
