= Workiz =

Software company

Workiz Sher
- Type: Private company
- Industry: Field Service Management
- Founded: 2015
- Founder: Idan Kadosh, Erez Marom, Saar Kohanovitch
- Headquarters: San Diego, California
- Area served: Worldwide
- Products: Saas CRM
- Number of employees: 150 (2024)
- Website: Workiz

Workiz, formerly SendAJob, is a San Diego–based Field Service Management platform. Its product is a SaaS field service management solution used by growing field service businesses from mid-size operators to larger multi-location companies. Its primary focus is industries such as HVAC, Plumbing, Locksmith, Appliance Repair, Electrician and Garage door technicians

== History ==
The startup was founded in 2015 by Idan Kadosh, Erez Marom, and Saar Kohanovitch. Kadosh and Marom worked as locksmiths for more than 15 years in San Diego. As of 2017, more than half of field service companies relied on pen and paper to manage their businesses. In 2018, the company raised $2.2 million in a Seed round led by Aleph Venture Capital. In 2019, the company raised $5M in a Series A led by Magenta Venture Partners. In 2021, the company raised $13M in a Series B led by New Era Capital Partners, with past backers Aleph, Magenta Venture Partners, Maor Investments and TMT Investments also participating in the round.

Workiz's CEO is Adi "Didi" Azaria, who was a co-founder of Sisense, a unicorn business intelligence tech company valued at more than $1 billion dollar as of 2020. Azaria joined the company in 2018 as part of their seed financing round led by Aleph Venture Capital. Tomer Levy joined in 2020 as the company's Chief Financial Officer.

The company's main differentiator is its phone service system capabilities, which provides clients a virtual phone system and ad tracking software. It also released a voice feature powered by Amazon Alexa to promote road safety for field service workers to interact with its platform handsfree. In 2019, Workiz announced their partnership with Chase Bank to allow field service professionals to use same-day payout, allowing them to bill and receive electronic payments while in the field. Following COVID-19, Workiz introduced an integration with Zoom to allow home service businesses to do remote video estimates. In 2021, it integrated with Gusto. Later that year, Workiz also partnered with Thumbtack.

In the summer of 2021, Workiz was ranked as the top Field Service Management software for small businesses by G2 for each of the following categories: Usability, Results and Relationship. Workiz was also recognized by the global research and advisory firm Gartner as a "Frontrunner" for top-rated Field Service Software products in North America for 2021. In 2019, Workiz was selected as both a "Facebook Playground" partner and a "Google for Startup Accelerator" partner.
