= Le Travel Store =

Retail store in San Diego, California

- Company type: Private
- Industry: Retail
- Founded: 1976
- Defunct: 2013
- Headquarters: San Diego, California
- Key people: Joan and Bill Keller, founders
- Website: http://www.letravelstore.com

Le Travel Store, based in San Diego, California, was a retail store that sold travel gear. Founded in 1976, Le Travel Store claimed to have been the first business to call itself a "travel store," and, the first retail store to cater to backpackers and other independent travelers, selling luggage, travel accessories, guidebooks, maps, and backpacks in a single retail location.

== History ==
Joan and Bill Keller opened the first Le Travel Store in Pacific Beach in November 1976 after noticing that independent travelers going to Europe, Asia, and Latin America were often using outdoor gear such as backpacks rather than more traditional luggage, but that no retail businesses were specifically geared towards these independent backpackers. The founding of Le Travel Store coincided with an increase in the popularity and feasibility of independent travel, which was also gave rise to numerous other companies, such as Lonely Planet, Eagle Creek, and STA Travel, that sought to cater to these travelers.

Le Travel Store was one of the original tenants when Horton Plaza opened in 1985, and then in 1994, it was one of the first retail businesses to move into San Diego's Gaslamp Quarter during that neighborhood's urban renewal. Since its early days, Le Travel Store has done mail order business, at first with a print catalog, and then, from 1996 on, at its ecommerce website.

Le Travel Store closed its doors in 2013 when the owners retired.

== Awards and citations ==
- 2002 Outdoor Industry Association Leadership Award
- 2001 Gaslamp Quarter Association Trailblazer of the Year
- 1998 Gaslamp Quarter Historical Foundation Pioneer Award
- 1995 Downtown San Diego Partnership Alonzo Award
