= Eric's Ultimate Solitaire =

Card game-based video game

- Developer: Delta Tao Software
- Publisher: Loki Software (Linux)
- Designer: Joe Williams
- Platforms: Mac OS, Mac OS X, Windows, Linux (Alpha/PowerPC/SPARC/x86)

Eric's Ultimate Solitaire (also known as Eric's Ultimate Solitaire X) is a commercial solitaire game developed by Delta Tao Software for the Macintosh. The game was later ported to Linux by Loki Software.

== Gameplay ==
The full game includes seventeen versions of solitaire, a number chosen because of the maximum number of items that could be shown in the menu of a Mac Plus without scrolling.

The game includes an undocumented feature where it displays messages on certain days, such as Martin Luther King, Jr.'s, birthday.

== Development ==
Apple Computer bundled the game with some Macintosh systems.

As of January 4, 2012, Delta Tao Software had not released an update compatible with Apple's Mac OS 10.7 (Lion) operating system. As of November 21, 2013, Sniderware released Eric's All-in-1 Solitaire as its successor.

== Reception ==
Washington Apple Pi Journal recommended reading the manual, not to learn about the game, but because it is funny.
