= Semantic Research =

Software companies based in California

Semantic AI, Inc.
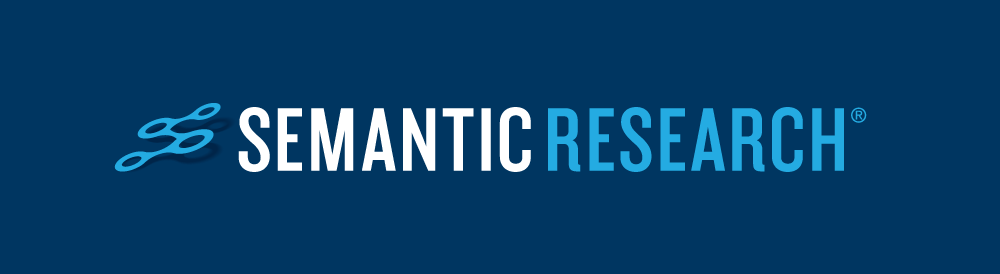
- Formerly: Semantic Research, Inc.
- Type: Private
- Industry: Software company
- Founded: 2001
- Headquarters: San Diego, California
- Products: Cortex EIP; Semantica Pro
- Number of employees: small business
- Website: www.semantic-ai.com

Semantic AI (formerly Semantic Research, Inc.) is a privately held software company headquartered in San Diego, California, with offices in the National Capitol Region. Semantic AI is a Delaware C-corporation that offers patented, graph-based knowledge discovery, analysis and visualization software technology. Its original product is a link analysis software application called Semantica Pro, and it introduced a web-based analytical environment called the Cortex Enterprise Intelligence Platform, or Cortex EIP.

== History ==
The SEMANTICA platform was originally conceived as a method to help biology students learn and retain knowledge about complex organic structures. Joe Faletti, Kathleen Fisher, and several colleagues in the University of California system created SemNet, a computer program used to draw a network of "concepts" connected to each other by "relations". In the late 1960s, Ross Quillian and Allan Collins used the concept of semantic networks as a way of talking about the organization of human semantic memory, or memory for inter-related word concepts. Using SemNet, students could employ simple components to build complex networks.

== See also ==
- Concept mapping
- Information visualization
- Intelligence analysis
- Knowledge representation
- Semantic network
