= Abacus Data Systems =

American software provider

AbacusNext
- Type: Private
- Industry: Software
- Founded: 1983; 43 years ago
- Founder: Judd Kessler
- Headquarters: San Diego, California, United States
- Key people: Scott Johnson (CEO); Mike Skelly (CFO)
- Products: Private cloud, practice management software, and CRM technology
- Services: Adoption, implementation, and management of technology solutions
- Revenue: US$77.5 million (2017)
- Website: getcaret.com

Abacus Data Systems, doing business as Caret or CARET (formerly AbacusNext), is an American software and private cloud services provider headquartered in San Diego, California.

The company, doing business as AbacusNext, announced its rebranding as CARET on February 21, 2023.

== Services and software ==
=== Cloud ===
Abacus Private Cloud is a private cloud sold as Desktop-as-a-Service within a Windows Server 2012 R2 environment. This service relies on Veeam Software for backup support, and is built on Intel-based architecture.

This private cloud service is colocated across three carrier-neutral data centers that are interconnected via a self-run optical network. These data centers are Scalematrix in San Diego, California, Skybox Houston One in Houston, Texas, and SUPERNAP by Switch in Las Vegas, Nevada.

=== Software ===
AbacusNext offers four Windows-based platforms, all of which rely on relational database management systems. Two are law practice management software for lawyers; AbacusLaw uses Advantage Database, while Amicus Attorney uses Microsoft SQL Server. AbacusNext has two platforms for accounting firms that rely on Microsoft SQL Server: ResultsCRM, a customer relationship management for QuickBooks, and OfficeTools practice management software.

== Management ==
- Keri Gohman, CEO (previously a partner at Bain Capital Ventures)
- Mike Skelly, CFO (former CFO of Trio Health, UpWind Solutions, and Active Network)

In December 2015, American private equity investment firm Providence Equity Partners took a strategic majority investment in AbacusNext (Abacus Data Systems at that time).

== Acquisitions ==
In May 2016, AbacusNext acquired Toronto-based software company Gavel & Gown, makers of Amicus Attorney.

Results Software, a Virginia-based software company and maker of ResultsCRM, was acquired in February 2017. In the same month, the company also acquired San Diego–based cloud hosting provider Cloudnine Realtime. In May of that same year, it also acquired Palmdale-based software company OfficeTools.

In November 2017, the company acquired Scotland-based software company HotDocs. HotDocs was previously owned by LexisNexis before being sold in 2009. A month later, New Hampshire–based software company Commercial Logic was acquired.
