= SMS.ac, Inc. =

Mobile data and Internet comms company

SMS.ac Inc.
- Type: Private
- Industry: Telephone, Mobile, Internet
- Founded: 2001
- Headquarters: San Diego, California, United States
- Key people: Michael Pousti, Chairman and CEO
- Products: SMS messaging
- Revenue: unknown
- Net income: unknown
- Number of employees: 100-200
- Website: www.sms.ac

Founded in 2001, SMS.ac Inc. is a mobile data and Internet communications company based in San Diego, California. With a worldwide connectivity to more than 400 mobile operators, the company offers a platform MMSbox for interpole exchange of MMS and SMS. The company (and its spinoff subsidiary FanBox, now rebranded as empowr) has claimed to serve over 14 billion mobile text messages in 2003, and 25 billion in 2004 where they were widely criticized for charging unrequested SMS services from consumers and for failing to respond to the complaints of users and for FanBox's e-mail activities. The company provides distribution and billing to people buying and selling digital content (video, music, and applications) through (SMS) mobile services and web-based applications. SMS.ac's website integrates its mobile billing technology with various social networking services like photos, videos, music, and comments. SMS.ac claims over 50 million registered users in more than 180 countries.

The SMS.ac website domain name uses the .ac top-level domain for Ascension Island.

As of June 2022, the domain is for sale and emails to the domain bounce due to lack of a configured mail server.

== Business model ==
SMS.ac's revenue is derived through revenue-sharing arrangements with content providers and mobile operators. Specifically, the company enables content providers to bill subscribers for consumption of video, music, and widgets through SMS-based (text message) mobile billing.

== History ==
At the time of its public launch in 2002, SMS.ac made history by signing up "nearly 6 million users in its first six months – making it the fastest product launch in Internet history".

In 2005, SMS.ac was recognized as one of "the top emerging companies in the Wireless industry" by Fierce Wireless's "Fierce 15". An article by the Chicago Tribune described "a clever text-messaging ploy" whereby users provide their e-mail address and password in response to a message to join.

In 2006 an article in the International Herald Tribune, while praising the service's integrated billing option, stated "SMS.ac is one of those right-place, right-time, right-technology companies that has nearly all the elements for colossal success. But it also has hovering over it a big red flag that could wrong-foot it at any moment as some consumers had complained on the Internet and in the mainstream press that SMS.ac has charged them for services they never asked for, making that billing relationship into potentially its greatest liability."

In 2007, SMS.ac created a DBA called FanBox, a social networking mobile desktop site.

In 2008, SMS.ac was fined £250,000 by the UK premium rate regulator, PhonepayPlus, for operating misleading and unfair mobile-terminating text message services without giving proper pricing information, and barred from operating reverse-billed services in the UK until it became compliant with the PhonepayPlus compliance rules. Following the ruling SMS.ac brought their practices into compliance with UK regulations.

On 18 July 2009 the alleged unfair labor practices of SMS.ac subsidiary, FanBox were reported by San Diego 6 News. In the coverage, former employees claimed they often received partial paychecks if they were paid at all.

== See also ==
- Marketplace
- Micropayments
- Social network
- User generated content
