= Genesee Scientific =

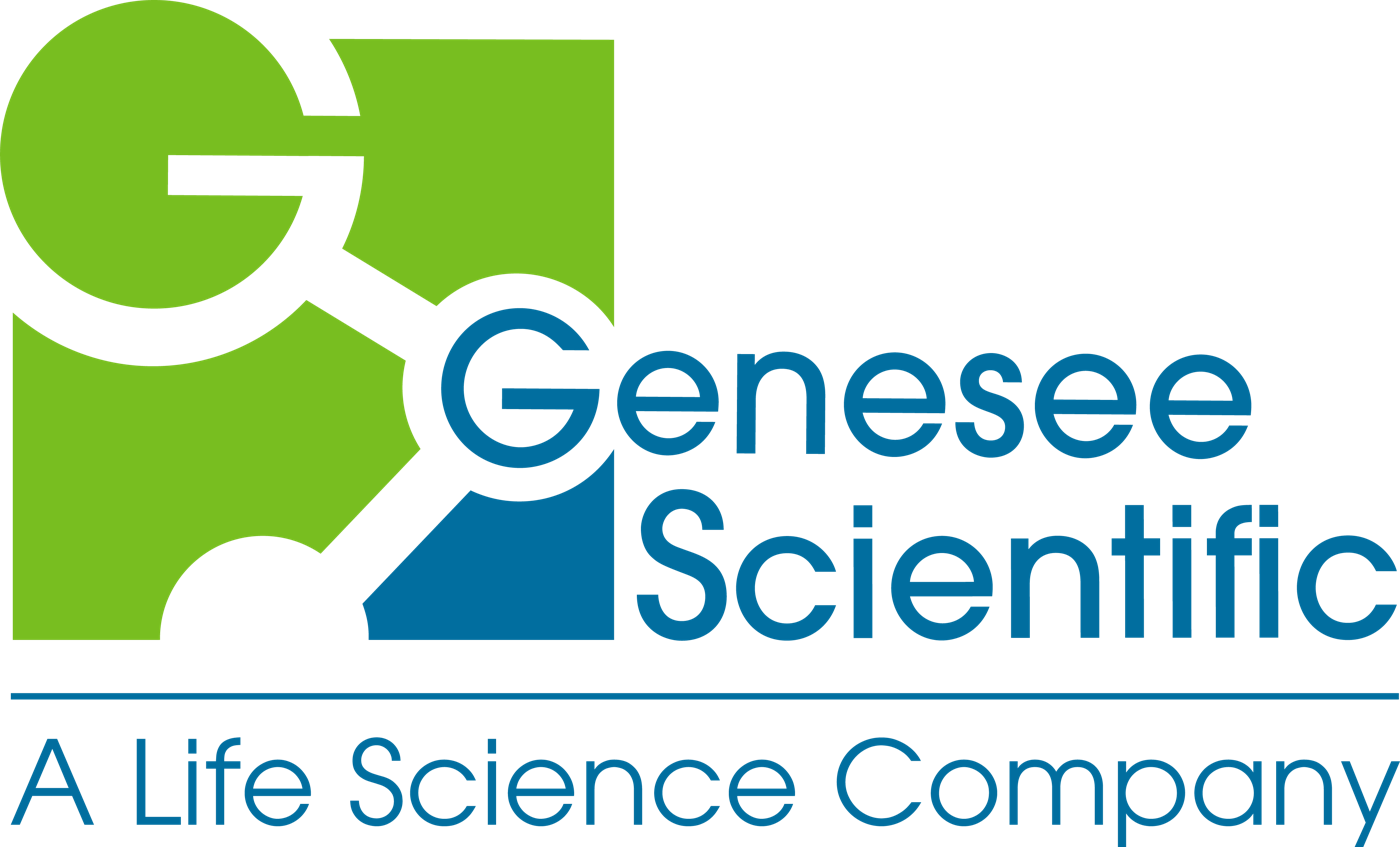
- Type: Private
- Industry: Life science research supplier, biotechnology, instruments, equipment, reagents and consumables, manufacturing, analysis, discovery and diagnostics
- Founded: 1995
- Headquarters: El Cajon, California; Poway, California; Morrisville, North Carolina
- Key people: Dan Monahan, CEO
- Number of employees: 67 (2023)
- Website: geneseesci.com flystuff.com

Genesee Scientific Corporation is a global life sciences supplier.

== History ==
Genesee Scientific was founded by Ken Fry in 1995 as a provider of supplies to laboratories located along Genesee Avenue in University City, San Diego.

Today, Genesee Scientific serves life science laboratories around the United States and the world.

Timeline

- 1995 - Genesee Scientific founded by Ken Fry.
- 2003 - Acquired United Scientific Plastics (USP), a California Bay Area distributor of laboratory plasticware.
- 2007 - Acquired Island Scientific, a Seattle area distributor of laboratory plasticware.
- 2007 - Established East Coast warehouse and offices located in Research Triangle Park, NC.
- 2009 - Acquired Continental Lab Products (CLP) brands.
- 2011 - Expansion of Olympus Plastics product line of tissue culture supplies.
- 2013 - Became an authorized Eppendorf distribution partner, a Germany-based manufacturer of instruments and consumables.
- 2016 - Introduction of Prometheus product line, proprietary products for protein biology research.
- 2017 - Launched GenClone product line, a full line of cell culture media products centered around ultra-pure, high-performance fetal bovine sera.
- 2021 - Acquired by LLR, a private equity firm investing in technology and healthcare businesses.

== Innovations ==
Genesee Scientific is the world leader in innovation for and supply to the Drosophila (fruit fly) research community. Drosophila are widely used as a model organism in the field of genetics.

Genesee Scientific has been awarded three patents by the United States Patent and Trademark Office for its revolutionary Drosophila vial racking system (patent numbers D673,296 S; 8,136,679 B2; and 8,430,251 B2). This Drosophila vial racking system significantly decreases time spent racking vials and is more environmentally friendly compared to traditional vial packaging configurations.

Genesee Scientific has also developed the first atlas of Drosophila phenotypic markers available on mobile devices..

== Registered trademarks ==
- Genesee Scientific (Reg. #: 3934361)
- Flowbuddy (Reg. #: 5617401)
- Flystuff, Drosophila research supplies and equipment (Reg. #: 5617401)
- Flugs, Cellulose acetate closures for vials (Reg. #: 3153821)
- INVICTUS, Incubators (Reg. #: 5617401)
- INVICTUS NEXT-GEN, Incubators (Reg. #: 5867956)
- Nutri-fly, Media for Drosophila research (Reg. #: 5626165)
- Droso-Plugs, Foam closures for vials (Reg. #: 5773033)
- SUPERBULK, Bulk supplies offering less packaging and smaller footprint (Reg. #: 5867964)
- GenClone, High-performance cell culture media products (Reg. #: 5322208 )
- Gene Choice, Competent cells for cloning (Reg. #: 4217346)
- NEXT-GEN, Latex and nitrile exam gloves (Reg. #: 3439167)
- UPrep, Spin columns for DNA and RNA purification (Reg. #: 3153821)
- Prometheus, Proprietary protein biology research products (Reg. #: 5322104)
- SECadex, Size exclusion chromatography media (Reg. #: 5322241)
- ProSignal, Electrophoresis, blotting, and detection reagents; X-ray film (Reg. #: 5322254)

== Brands ==
- Apex provides a variety of chemicals & reagents to the life science industry.
- Blue Devil provides film is used for autoradiography, Western blotting, sequencing, chemiluminescence and gel shift analysis.
- Droso-Plugs
- Flowbuddy
- Flystuff provides products and services specifically for the Drosophila research community.
- The Flyer
- Gene Choice provides competent cells for cloning applications.
- GenClone provides cell culture media, sera (FBS), buffers, and reagents for cell and tissue culture.
- GC10
- GCS
- NEXT-GEN
- Nutri-fly provides nutrient balanced media formulations specifically for Drosophila melanogaster.
- Olympus Plastics provides plasticware for general liquid handling and cell and tissue culture applications.
- Poseidon provides ergonomic liquid handling equipment including precision pipettes and pipet controllers.
- Prometheus provides protein separation/purification resins and Western blotting reagents and consumables.
- SECadex
- TITAN provides powder-free nitrile and latex examination gloves.
- UPrep provides spin columns for DNA and RNA (nucleic acid) purification.
- Wormstuff

== Citations ==
Following is a list of links to articles published in scientific journals that cite Genesee Scientific:

- Miller, JA; Carmichael, A; Ramírez, MJ; Spagna, JC; Haddad, CR; Rezác, M; Johannesen, J; Král, J; Wang, XP; Griswold, CE (2010). "Phylogeny of entelegyne spiders: Affinities of the family Penestomidae (NEW RANK), generic phylogeny of Eresidae, and asymmetric rates of change in spinning organ evolution (Araneae, Araneoidea, Entelegynae)". Molecular Phylogenetics and Evolution. 55 (3): 786–804. Bibcode:2010MolPE..55..786M. doi:10.1016/j.ympev.2010.02.021. hdl:11336/276753. PMID 20206276.
- Suissa, S; Wang, Z; Poole, J; et al. (May 2009). "Ancient mtDNA Genetic Variants Modulate mtDNA Transcription and Replication". PLOS Genetics. 5 (5) e1000474. doi:10.1371/journal.pgen.1000474. PMC 2673036. PMID 19424428.
- Díaz-Castillo, C; Xia, XQ; Ranz, JM (2012). "Evaluation of the Role of Functional Constraints on the Integrity of an Ultraconserved Region in the Genus Drosophila". PLOS Genetics. 8 (2) e1002475. doi:10.1371/journal.pgen.1002475. PMC 3271063. PMID 22319453.
- Goda, T; Mirowska, K; Currie, J; Kim, MH; Rao, NV; Bonilla, G; Wijnen, H (2011). "Adult Circadian Behavior in Drosophila Requires Developmental Expression of cycle, But Not period". PLOS Genetics. 7 (7) e1002167. doi:10.1371/journal.pgen.1002167. PMC 3131292. PMID 21750685.
- Burd, CE; Jeck, WR; Liu, Y; Sanoff, HK; Wang, Z; Sharpless, NE (2010). "Expression of Linear and Novel Circular Forms of an INK4/ARF-Associated Non-Coding RNA Correlates with Atherosclerosis Risk". PLOS Genetics. 6 (12) e1001233. doi:10.1371/journal.pgen.1001233. PMC 2996334. PMID 21151960.
- "Arabidopsis DNA extractions: 96-well format: (Alonso-Stepanova Lab protocol)". ncsu.edu. Archived from the original on 2010-08-14.
- https://www.jove.com/video/2641/isolation-of-drosophila-melanogaster-testes
- "Arabidopsis DNA extractions from individual plants in microcentrifuge tubes (Alonso-Stepanova Lab protocol)". ncsu.edu. Archived from the original on 2010-08-14.
- https://web.archive.org/web/20160303225004/http://cda.currentprotocols.com/WileyCDA/CPUnit/refId-cb0418.html
- https://www.jove.com/video/3786/endurance-training-protocol-and-longitudinal-performance-assays-for-drosophila-melanogaster
- https://www.jove.com/video/2541/a-simple-way-to-measure-ethanol-sensitivity-in-flies
