= InvivoGen =

- Type: Private Corporation
- Industry: Manufacturing
- Founded: 1997
- Founder: Gerard Tiraby
- Headquarters: San Diego, California, United States
- Products: Innate immunity; Cell Culture; Cloning; Gene Expression; ORF; RNA Interference; Immunoglobulin
- Website: www.invivogen.com

InvivoGen is a manufacturer of life science research products. It is based in San Diego, California, and conducts business worldwide.

InvivoGen is a provider of toll-like receptor related products (mainly ligands and engineered mammalian cell lines), selection antibiotics and mycoplasma detection & elimination products. To date, about 99,500 academic papers cite InvivoGen's products.

InvivoGen also provides a collection of more 1000 open reading frame of human and rodent origins.

== History ==
InvivoGen was founded in 1977 in Toulouse, France. The company is known for its mycoplasma detection and removal agents and its toll-like receptor product line. Although its first products focused on gene therapy, the company now produces tools for innate immunity research, immunology research, cancer research, RNA interference, cell culture, cloning and gene expression. Current products are classified as: cell lines; inhibitors; vaccine adjuvants; cloning and expression; cell culture; PRR ligands; antibodies and ELISAs; proteins and peptides; genes and promoters. Invivogen also offers services for immunomodulatory compound screening and custom cloning.
