= Cool-jams =

American apparel company

- Company type: Privately-held
- Industry: Clothing
- Founded: 2007; 19 years ago
- Founder: Anita Mahaffey
- Headquarters: San Diego, California, United States
- Area served: United States
- Products: wicking sleepwear
- Website: www.cool-jams.com

Cool-jams is an American apparel company. It is the largest wicking sleepwear company in the United States.

== History ==
Cool-jams was founded by Anita Mahaffey in 2007 as an online store selling bedding and pajamas. The privately held company both produces and retails its goods. Mahaffey served as the company’s CEO until 2023 when it was acquired by Inversal,. The company was originally founded in San Diego.

== Products ==
The pajamas are designed to wick heat and moisture away from the body during rest and manage temperature regulation issues. Mahaffey developed the line after her own experiences with menopause.

The quick drying, moisture wicking products have also been designed for individuals living in or traveling to hot climates. The company has customers in about 150 countries, and is the largest wicking sleepwear company in the United States. In 2013 Apparel Magazine named its products one of the most innovative of 2013. 20% of the company’s profits are donated to women and children focused charities.
