= Skyriver =

Internet service provider in San Diego, California

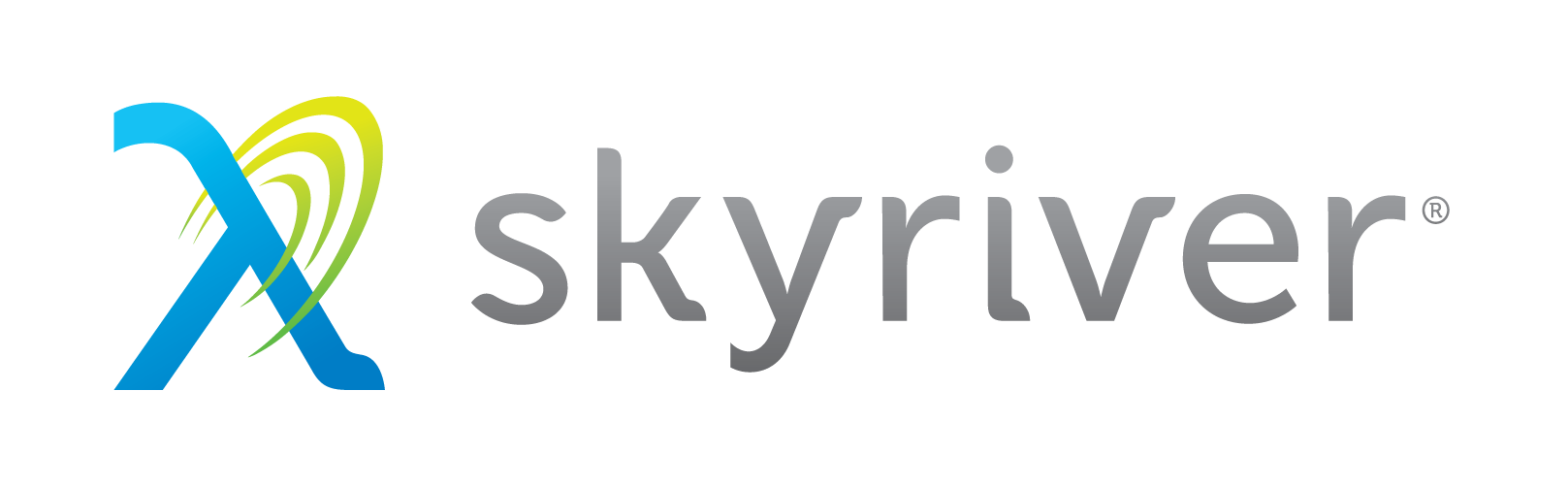
- Company type: Private
- Industry: Internet service provider (ISP), telecommunications
- Founded: 2000
- Headquarters: 7310 Miramar Rd. Ste. 600 San Diego, CA 92126
- Area served: California, United States
- Products: Broadband internet, VPN, termporary/event bandwidth
- Number of employees: 50
- Website: www.skyriver.net

Skyriver was a business broadband Internet provider headquartered in San Diego, California. It was acquired by One Ring Networks in July, 2018. Skyriver delivered broadband Internet connectivity for enterprise and small-medium businesses, utilizing its proprietary millimeter wave technology. Skyriver offered commercial grade services including dedicated Internet access, Virtual Private Network (VPN), redundancy, and temporary Internet/event bandwidth in California.

== History ==
Skyriver was founded in September 2000. In March 2003 Skyriver formed the SkyWeb Alliance with two other regional providers in California. Skyriver acquired California-based Internet service provider Terracom Network Services (TNS), closing the deal in March 2004. In 2005 Skyriver acquired San Diego–based IT outsourcing provider Integrate IT, Inc. In 2007 Skyriver completed its backhaul upgrade in anticipation of its planned WiMAX rollout. In 2007 Skyriver added Orange County, California to its fixed wireless service area. Wireless broadband rates of 3 Mbit/s to 200 Mbit/s were marketed in Anaheim, La Habra, Garden Grove, Fullerton, Brea and Orange. In 2008 Skyriver acquired the assets of Nethere, Inc.

== See also ==
- Wireless network
- Wireless Internet service provider
