= Cerenome =

U.S. healthcare company

Cerenome, Inc.
- Type: Public
- Traded as: Nasdaq: CNSY
- Industry: Biotechnology / Pharmaceuticals
- Headquarters: Houston, Texas, U.S.
- Website: cerenome.com//

Cerenome, Inc. Logo.

Cerenome, Inc. (formerly Plus Therapeutics, Inc.) is a clinical-stage pharmaceutical company headquartered in Houston, Texas, that develops targeted radiotherapeutics and diagnostic services for brain and central nervous system (CNS) cancers. The company’s lead therapeutic candidate, marketed as REYOBIQ™ (rhenium Re-186 obisbemeda), is an investigational liposomal radiopharmaceutical under clinical evaluation for recurrent glioblastoma, leptomeningeal metastases, and certain pediatric brain cancers. Cerenome also commercialized a molecular diagnostic service, CNSide®.

== Company history ==
Cerenome, Inc. (Plus Therapeutics, Inc. until August 3, 2026), was formerly known as Cytori Therapeutics, Inc. In 2017, Cytori Therapeutics announced that it had acquired a nanomedicine platform. In 2019, Cytori Therapeutics announced that it had divested its autologous cell therapy assets to Lorem Vascular of Australia and Seijiro Shirahama of Japan. In 2019, Cytori Therapeutics announced that it had changed its focus and name to Plus Therapeutics. In 2020, Plus Therapeutics announced that it had licensed a novel oncology platform, including multiple radiopharmaceutical assets. Plus Therapeutics announced on July 31, 2026 a rebranding as Cerenome, which took effect on August 3, 2026.

== Core technology: Rhenium NanoLiposome radiotherapeutics ==
Cerenome is developing nanoliposome-encapsulated BMEDA-chelated radioisotope drugs to treat various types of cancer. Rhenium (186Re) Obisbemeda, trademarked as REYOBIQ™, is a Rhenium-186 radiolabeled therapeutic targeting recurrent glioblastoma, leptomeningeal metastases, and pediatric brain cancers. Their BMEDA loading technology coupled with Rhenium-186 allows for the entrapment of the radiation particle within a nanoliposome carrier, facilitating accumulation and retention in the tumor tissue. This approach supports higher, more effective radiation doses without significant toxicity.

Rhenium-186 (186Re) (half-life 90 hours) is a reactor produced isotope with great potential for medical therapy. It is in the same chemical family as Technetium-99m (99mTc), a radioactive tracer that is the most commonly used isotope for diagnostic scintigraphic imaging in nuclear medicine. Like 99mTc, rhenium is not taken up by bone and is readily cleared by the kidneys.

While 186Re emits therapeutic beta particles, every 10th isotope decay also produces a gamma photon. The average 186Re beta particle path length in tissue of 2 millimeters is ideal for treatment of solid tumors. Additionally, the emitted gamma photons have similar photon energy to those emitted by 99mTc, allowing for imaging of the isotope within the body on standard nuclear imaging equipment available in routine medical practice. Therefore, the 186Re isotope has great potential in Convection Enhanced Delivery (CED) applications of local therapy of solid tumors. However, a carrier is needed to deliver the isotope to the brain and maintain its localization at the desired site, as otherwise it would quickly disperse and be carried away from the site of injection by the circulatory system.

Nanotechnology describes the use of atoms, molecules, or compounds to create extremely small materials and structures, having a size of 100 to 1 nanometers, with special properties that can be applied across many disciplines including electronics, energy, environment, and medicine. In medicine, these materials and structures are often used for site-specific drug delivery and take the form various organic and inorganic nanoparticles. Nanoparticle morphology, both size and shape, affects how cells in the body “see” these nanoparticles and ultimately influences their toxicity, distribution, and targeting ability. Of the various nanotechnology drug delivery systems, NanoLiposomes have been extensively explored and undergone significant technical advances since they were first developed in 1965. Today, many are regulatory-approved and clinically- and commercially-proven across multiple medical areas including, but not limited to, cancer treatment, fungal infections, and pain management. NanoLiposomes are small, complex, spontaneously-forming drug carriers consisting of a precise formulation of naturally occurring phospholipids and cholesterol — nearly identical to the lipid membranes of normal human cells. This means that there are natural degradation pathways in the human body for these lipid nanoparticles. NanoLiposome properties such as size and structure, electrical charge, lipid composition, and surface modification are each critical to the ability of the product to provide reproducible drug delivery required by regulatory authorities and relied upon by physicians and patients. Although larger liposomes can be manufactured, the most useful size range for drug carrier applications is 80-100 nanometers. NanoLiposomes of this size have the ability to facilitate retention at the site of injection.

NanoLiposomes in the 100 nanometer size range have been the most investigated carrier for convection-enhanced delivery (CED) of drugs to the brain. These studies include the use of CED-delivery of NanoLiposomes carrying chemotherapeutic agents directly to brain tumor, including drugs such as irinotecan and topotecan. If NanoLiposomes are to be utilized as a carrier for radioisotopes, a method for the efficient loading of NanoLiposomes with the radioisotopes is needed. Such a method has been developed for the labeling of NanoLiposomes with radiotherapeutic Rhenium radionuclides to very high levels of specific activity. This novel approach uses a specially developed molecule known as BMEDA-2 to chelate with Rhenium-186 and carry it into the interior of a NanoLiposome where it is irreversibly trapped.

== ReSPECT-GBM Clinical Trial for Recurrent Glioblastoma ==
The purpose of the ReSPECT-GBM Clinical Trial is to assess the safety, tolerability, and distribution of a new medication, Rhenium (186Re) Obisbemeda, in adults with recurrent glioblastoma after standard surgical, radiation, and/or chemotherapy treatment. ReSPECT-GBM is supported by the U.S. National Institutes of Health / National Cancer Institute and has a National Trial Number of NCT01906385. As of January 2025, the study is enrolling Phase 2 patients and has clinical study site locations at UT Health San Antonio in San Antonio, Texas, UT Southwestern Medical Center in Dallas, Texas, UT MD Anderson Cancer Center in Houston, Texas, and Ohio State University in Columbus, Ohio.

According to the most recent CBTRUS Statistical Report, annually there are approximately 12,900 cases of glioblastoma diagnosed, with historical 1 year and 5 year relative survival rates of 40.8% and 6.8%, respectively. The poor survival is attributable partly to the nature of the tumor. The infiltrative nature of glioblastoma results in difficulty eliminating microscopic disease despite macroscopic gross-total resection, with 90% of patients having recurrence at the original tumor location. The location of the tumor also makes drug delivery difficult with only small or lipophilic molecules able to cross the blood brain barrier to reach the tumor. Of those agents that are able to reach the tumor, glioblastomas have shown to be resistant to most cytotoxic agents and to quickly develop resistance when initially sensitive.

== ReSPECT-LM Clinical Trial for Leptomeningeal Metastases ==
Cerenome is developing Rhenium (186Re) Obisbemeda, an innovative, targeted radiotherapeutic for multiple rare and difficult-to-treat cancers including Leptomeningeal Metastases (LM). In the U.S. multi-center ReSPECT-LM Phase 1 dose optimization clinical trial, Rhenium (186Re) Obisbemeda will be administered through an intraventricular catheter (Ommaya reservoir) in patients with LM. The treatment consists of a single administered dose of 186RNL per patient on an outpatient basis by the clinical trial physician. The ReSPECT-LM U.S. Phase 1 Clinical Trial is enrolling patients as of January 2025 and has clinical study site location at UT Health San Antonio in San Antonio.

The ReSPECT-LM clinical trial is funded, in part, by a $17.6 million grant from the Cancer Prevention & Research Institute of Texas, the second largest public funding source for cancer research in the world. The National Trial Number for this clinical trial is NCT07098806.In May 2026, Phase 1 ReSPECT-LM trial data were presented in a plenary session at the American Association of Neurological Surgeons (AANS) Annual Scientific Meeting in San Antonio, Texas. The completed single-dose escalation study reported a median overall survival of approximately 9 months in patients treated at the recommended Phase 2 dose, compared to a historical median of approximately 2–6 months, along with a favorable safety profile and evidence of immune remodeling within the tumor microenvironment.

Leptomeningeal metastases (LM) are a rare but typically fatal complication of advanced cancer in which cancer cells spread to the central nervous system (CNS) and are found in either the leptomeninges (membrane surrounding the brain and spinal cord) or cerebrospinal fluid (CSF) (circulates nutrients and chemicals to the brain and spinal cord). Leptomeningeal Metastases is sometimes referred to as leptomeningeal cancer, leptomeningeal disease, neoplastic meningitis, or meningeal carcinomatosis, and is most commonly found in patients with melanoma, breast, lung, or gastrointestinal cancer. Despite affecting over 110,000 people annually in the U.S., there are currently no FDA approved treatments specifically for Leptomeningeal Metastases.

== ReSPECT-PBC Clinical Trial for Pediatric Brain Cancer ==
Cerenome is developing the Rhenium (186Re) Obisbemeda radiotherapeutic for the treatment of rare, frequently fast-growing pediatric brain and spinal cord tumors with a poor prognosis, ependymoma and high-grade glioma (HGG). The ReSPECT-PBC (Pediatric Brain Cancer) U.S. Phase 1 Clinical Trial is planned to initiate in 2025.

Cancer is the leading cause of death by disease among children in the U.S. Brain and spinal cord tumors are the 2nd most common cancers in children, accounting for ~26% of childhood cancers.

Ependymoma is a rare, slow- or fast-growing (depends on Grade) primary CNS tumor that forms in ependymal cells that line the ventricles of the brain and the center of the spinal cord; may spread throughout the CNS but spread outside of the CNS is rare; all can recur but often patients are tumor-free for years before testing shows new tumor growth, either at the same location as the first tumor or somewhere else within the CNS.

HGG is a rare, fast-growing CNS tumor that forms in glial cells of the brain and spinal cord; can be found almost anywhere within the CNS, but are most commonly within the supratentorium in children ages 15–19; HGG found in children are different from those in adults.

== Other research and applications ==
Rhenium is a versatile radioisotope (radioactive isotope) that emits beta energy with a short half-life (17 to 90 hours) and sufficient energy for destroying tumor tissue – as well as a gamma energy with photons for live imaging through the treatment process. Cerenome leverages two different radioisotopes, Rhenium-186 and Rhenium-188, which offer unique physical properties for treating various tumor sizes and types. Rhenium-186 is nuclear reactor-produced 1.8 mm average radiation path length of beta energy and suitable for treating small and medium size tumors. Rhenium-188 is generator-produced for quick availability 3.1 mm average radiation path length of beta energy and suitable for treating large size tumors.

As of January 2024, the company is evaluating the safety and efficacy of 188RNL-BAM in preclinical trials for targeting primary liver cancer, hepatocellular carcinoma, and secondary liver cancer, metastatic colorectal cancer.
