= Digital Darkroom =

- Original authors: Ed Bomke; Don Cone
- Developer: Silicon Beach Software
- Release: 1987; 39 years ago
- Platform: Apple Macintosh
- Type: Raster graphics editor
- License: Proprietary software

Digital Darkroom was a graphics program for editing gray-scale photos, published by Silicon Beach Software for the Macintosh in 1987. It was programmed by Ed Bomke and Don Cone.

Digital Darkroom was the first Macintosh program to incorporate a plug-in architecture. Silicon Beach and Ed Bomke are credited with having coined the term "plug-in".

Another innovation of Digital Darkroom was the Magic Wand tool, which also appeared later in Photoshop.

When Silicon Beach Software was acquired by Aldus Corporation, Digital Darkroom continued to be published by the Aldus Consumer Division, but was never updated to include color.

The trademark "Digital Darkroom" was acquired by MicroFrontier in 1997 and used for a completely new image-editing program that does work with color. The software was acquired by Digimage Arts in 2002 and was sold for both Windows and Mac systems.
