= BikeBandit =

Defunct American motorcycle parts retailer

- Company type: Private
- Industry: Retail
- Founded: San Diego, California, United States (1999)
- Defunct: February 7, 2022; 4 years ago
- Headquarters: Spring Valley, California, United States
- Key people: Robert “Rosie” Rosenberg (Owner)
- Products: Motorcycle parts, apparel, and accessories
- Revenue: $0M USD Filed Chapter 7 (Liquidation) 2022
- Number of employees: 0
- Website: www.bikebandit.com

BikeBandit is a former motorcycle parts superstore retailer founded in 1999 by successful serial entrepreneur Ken Wahlster. Wahlster sold the company in 2013 and has gone on to open other companies in the motorcycle industry (8 Ball Motorcycle Tires, Inc) as well as other markets (retail, consulting, etc.). The company was well known for selling motorcycle parts, apparel, and accessories through an online store. The company ceased operations on February 7, 2022.

== Overview ==
BikeBandit was an online retailer of motorcycle parts and accessories with product offerings for street motorcycles, cruisers, ATVs and snowmobiles. The company was founded in 1999 by former CEO Ken Wahlster. Wahlster grew the company to approximately $65M in sales ranking it #326 in the Internet Retailer Top 500. Wahlster sold the majority of the company in 2013 and the remainder in 2015 to Affinity Development Group. In 2017 the company was sold by Affinity Development Group (California bulk sale Document 2017-0207637) to Vey's Bandit LLC (Vey's Powersports). The company initially operated out of Wahlster’s home and later grew to occupy a 107,000 square foot facility shipping 10,000 items per day to 27 countries with a customer base of approximately 700,000. After the 2017 sale to Vey's Powersports Bikebandit eventually relocated to a 30,000 square foot warehouse in Spring Valley CA.

On February 7, 2022 Vey's Bandit LLC filed for Chapter 7 Bankruptcy in San Diego and vacated their office space and warehouse. The case number is 22-00294-CL7. Since then the owner of Vey's Bandit LLC (Robert "Rosie" Rosenberg, currently owner of Vey's Powersports in San Diego) has allegedly fled with over $670,000 of customers money. Multiple lawsuits and BBB claims have been filed against Mr. Rosenberg and Vey's Bandit LLC. The Trustee's commentary includes harsh statements such as:

“While additional discovery is needed, there is already ample evidence that the Debtor's (Mr, Rosenberg) sworn bankruptcy papers filed in the case are factually untrue in material respects. Many creditors were omitted from the Debtor's sworn bankruptcy papers. For example, all of Debtor's consumer creditors, many (possibly thousands) of whom deposited money with the Debtor that the Debtor later absconded with and others who purchased gift cards or earned "points" in a rewards program Debtor operated pre-petition are altogether omitted from the Debtor's sworn bankruptcy papers,”

and

“It remains unclear why the Debtor (Mr, Rosenberg) continued to operate its business well past the point of insolvency and, even worse, continued to accept online orders when it was apparent the Debtor would not be able to fulfill those orders. The Trustee is informed and believes that the Debtor contemplated filing bankruptcy as early as February 2021 and was unable to pay its debts as they came due no later than by that time. Despite these facts, the Debtor continued to accept online orders and charge consumers credit cards at least until weeks or days before the petition date, for orders that it was knowingly unable to fulfill from its available inventory. The Trustee also believes that the Debtor collected sales taxes on these phantom sales that were never returned to the consumer or remitted to the proper taxing authorities,”

== Operations ==
BikeBandit’s headquarters were located in Otay Mesa, a community in the southern section of San Diego, California. In this location the company was eligible for tax credits through zoning regulations realized from the San Diego Regional Enterprise Zone (“SDREZ”) program. In 2013, U-T San Diego noted BikeBandit as one of seven San Diego firms ranked among the Top 500 Internet Retailers. At its peak, the company employed over 100 people with revenue in excess of $65M per year. According to Inc. Magazine, in 2015 the company employed a staff of 70 employees with annual revenues of $35M. ChicagoNow announced that BikeBandit was to release a mobile app for the iPhone in early 2010. While Wahlster was CEO BikeBandit was named to the Internet Retailer Top 500 in 2007-2014.

== Products ==
BikeBandit sold OEM parts, aftermarket parts, accessories, gear and tires for motorcycles, scooters, ATVs, snowmobiles, and personal watercraft.

== Sponsorships and partnerships ==
- Title Sponsor of the 2013 AMA Vintage Motorcycle Days event held on July 19–21 at the Mid-Ohio Sports Car Course in Lexington Ohio.
- Title Sponsor of the 2014 AMA Vintage Motorcycle Days event held by the American Motorcycle Association (AMA)
- Sponsor of the 2014 AMA Go Ride Safely! Week, an event held by the American Motorcyclist Association to promote rider responsibility and driver awareness.
- Hosted Project Re-Cycle in coordination with Cycle World Magazine. Project Re-Cycle is a non-profit benefit for the Pediatric Brain Tumor Foundation (PBTF).
