= FutureWave Software =

American software company, creator of FutureSplash Animator

FutureWave Software, Inc.
- The FutureWave Software logo, used from 1993 until being acquired by Macromedia
- Type: Private
- Founded: January 22, 1993; 33 years ago
- Founder: Charlie Jackson; Jonathan Gay
- Defunct: December 1996
- Fate: Acquired by Macromedia
- Successor: Adobe Systems; Macromedia
- Headquarters: San Diego, California, U.S.
- Area served: United States
- Website: http://www.futurewave.com (archived 1996-11-05 from the original)

FutureWave Software, Inc. was a software development company based in San Diego, California, co-founded by Charlie Jackson and Jonathan Gay on January 22, 1993. The company is best known for developing FutureSplash Animator, a vector graphics web animation tool released in 1995. When Macromedia acquired FutureWave in December 1996, it renamed the product Macromedia Flash, which went on to become the dominant platform for interactive web content throughout the late 1990s and 2000s. After Macromedia's own acquisition by Adobe Systems in 2005, Flash was rebranded as Adobe Flash.

== History ==
The company's first product was SmartSketch, a drawing program developed for the PenPoint OS and EO tablet computer. The VP of Marketing was Michelle Alsip-Welsh, who had previously worked at Silicon Beach Software and Aldus Corporation. When pen computing failed to gain traction in the market, SmartSketch was ported to Microsoft Windows and Macintosh.

Recognising the potential for vector-based animation on the rapidly growing World Wide Web, FutureWave modified SmartSketch by adding frame-by-frame animation capabilities and re-released it in 1995 as FutureSplash Animator. The tool produced compact vector-based animations that could be embedded in web pages and played via a browser plugin, making it well suited to the low-bandwidth internet connections common at the time. Early adopters included Microsoft and Disney, who used FutureSplash on their websites. By that time the company had expanded to include programmer Robert Tatsumi, artist Adam Grofcsik and PR specialist Ralph Mittman.

In December 1996, Macromedia acquired FutureWave and renamed FutureSplash Animator as Macromedia Flash. Flash subsequently became the standard technology for interactive and animated web content throughout the late 1990s and 2000s.
