= Tealium =

American company

- Industry: Marketing technology
- Founded: 2008
- Headquarters: San Diego, California, U.S.
- Number of locations: US, Germany, Singapore, Japan, UK, France, Australia, Spain, Hong Kong, Netherlands
- Area served: Worldwide
- Key people: Jeff Lunsford (Chief Executive Officer); Mike Anderson (Founder & Chief Technical Officer); Ali Behnam (Founder); Doug Lindroth (Chief Financial Officer); Phil Maynard (Chief Legal Officer); Ted Purcell (Chief Revenue Officer); Heidi Bullock (Chief Marketing Officer)
- Products: SaaS, Customer Data Hub, Martech Solutions
- Brands: Tealium Customer Data Hub, Tealium iQ Tag Management, Tealium AudienceStream CDP, Tealium EventStream API Hub, Tealium DataAccess, Tealium Predict ML, Tealium Private Cloud
- Website: www.tealium.com

Tealium is an American company founded in 2008 in San Diego, California, that sells enterprise tag management, an API hub, a customer data platform with machine learning, and data management products. It has offices in the United States, Singapore, UK, Germany, Japan, Netherlands, France and Australia.

== History ==
Tealium was founded in 2008 in San Diego, California, by Mike Anderson, Ali Behnam, and Olivier Silvestre, who previously worked together at WebSideStory, a SaaS-based web analytics company later acquire by Omniture, and later by Adobe Systems. Jeff Lunsford, previously the CEO at Limelight Networks and WebSideStory, was appointed CEO of Tealium in January 2013.

In the early 2010's, Tealium expanded its platform beyond tag management and leaned into customer data platforms (CDPs), enabling organizations to centralize customer data across digital channels. In April 2013, Tealium raised $15.6 million in a Series C funding round led by Tenaya Capital, with participation from Battery Ventures and Presidio Ventures, bringing its total funding at the time to $27.2 million.

In January 2017, Tealium and Possible APAC became partners.

In May 2019 the company announced Series F of investment and raised $55 million. The round was led by Silver Lake Waterman with ABN AMRO, Bain Capital, Declaration Partners, Georgian Partners, Industry Ventures, Parkwood and Presidio Ventures also participating. Its total valuation reached $850 million.
