= Delta Tao Software =

American software developer and publisher

- Company type: Corporation
- Industry: Video games
- Founded: 1990; 36 years ago
- Headquarters: 8032 Twin Oaks Ave, Citrus Heights, CA 95610
- Key people: Tim Cotter and Joe Williams
- Products: Software
- Website: deltatao.com

Delta Tao Software is an American software developer and publisher focusing on games for Macintosh, though some of its more popular products have been ported to Windows, Linux, and other platforms.

== History ==
Delta Tao was founded in 1989 by Joe Williams and Tim Cotter, who had developed Color MacCheese, a paint program notable for being the first to use 24-bit color and for its $49 price tag at a time when its nearest competitor, PixelPaint, was $399. Delta Tao hosted a booth at Mac World Boston in 1990, featuring Color MacCheese and Polly MacBeep.

Delta Tao uses minimalist software packaging, which has earned them recognition as an eco-friendly software company. A demo version of the company's Eric's Ultimate Solitaire program was shipped with each Macintosh at one point.

== Bibliography ==
- Spaceward Ho!
- Clan Lord
- Eric's Ultimate Solitaire
- Multiple Dark Castle derivatives
- Strategic Conquest
- Eric's Cascade
- Color MacCheese
- Apprentice
- Zeus
- Monet
- Polly MacBeep
- WonderPrint
