= Silicon Beach Software =

Macintosh software developer

Silicon Beach Software, Inc.
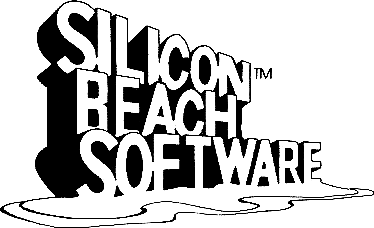
- Industry: Software
- Founded: 1984; 42 years ago in San Diego, California
- Founder: Charlie Jackson and Hallie Jackson
- Defunct: 1990
- Fate: Acquired by Aldus Corporation

Silicon Beach Software, Inc. was an early American developer of software products for the Macintosh personal computer. It was founded in San Diego, California, in 1984 by Charlie Jackson and his wife Hallie. Jackson later co-founded FutureWave Software with Jonathan Gay. FutureWave produced the first version of what is now Adobe Flash. Although Silicon Beach Software began as a publisher of game software, it also published what was called "productivity software" at the time.

== History ==
Silicon Beach's best known "productivity software" product was SuperPaint, a graphics program which combined features of Apple's MacDraw and MacPaint with several innovations of its own. SuperPaint2 and Digital Darkroom were the first programs on the Macintosh to offer a plug-in architecture, allowing outside software developers to extend both programs' capabilities. Silicon Beach coined the term "plug-in".

Silicon Beach was a pioneer in graphic tools for desktop publishing. Not only was SuperPaint a tool that had advanced graphic editing capabilities for its day, but Digital Darkroom was also a pioneering photo editor. It was grayscale-only, not color (early Macintosh computers were black and white-only), but had a number of interface innovations, including the Magic Wand tool, which also appeared later in Photoshop. It also had a proprietary option for printing grayscale content on dot matrix printers. Digital Darkroom was used professionally to clean up scanned images for clip art libraries.

Another Silicon Beach product was SuperCard which, like SuperPaint, superseded the capabilities of an Apple-branded product (in this case, HyperCard). SuperCard used a superset of the HyperTalk programming language and addressed common complaints about HyperCard by adding native support for color, multiple windows, support for vector images, menus and other features.

Silicon Beach Software produced video games for the Macintosh. The most well known is Dark Castle released in 1986. It was ported to several other operating systems by other companies. Sequel Beyond Dark Castle was Silicon Beach's last game, because productivity software was much more lucrative. Their 1985 release, Airborne!, was the first Macintosh game to feature digitized sound.

Silicon Beach Software is credited with coining the term Silicon Beach to refer to San Diego in the same way that the name Silicon Valley refers to the Santa Clara Valley and San Jose area.

Silicon Beach was acquired by Aldus Corporation in 1990 and Aldus, in turn, by Adobe Systems in 1994.

== Other products ==
- Airborne! (1985) combat game. A demo before the game was released was called Banzai!.
- Enchanted Scepters (1984) Point-and-click adventure game made with the engine that later became World Builder.
- World Builder (1986) graphical adventure game authoring package.
- Apache Strike (1987) 3D helicopter game.
- Beyond Dark Castle (1987) Sequel to Dark Castle.
- Super 3D (1988) 3D modeling application.
- Silicon Press (1986) card and label printing software
- Personal Press (1988) easy to use desktop publishing software, later renamed Adobe Home Publisher
