= Aldus Corporation =

Desktop publishing software company

- Industry: Software
- Founded: February 1984
- Founders: Jeremy Jaech; Mark Sundstrom; Mike Templeman; Dave Walter; Paul Brainerd
- Defunct: November 1994
- Fate: Merged
- Successor: Adobe Systems
- Headquarters: Seattle
- Products: PageMaker

Aldus Corporation was an American software company best known for its pioneering desktop publishing software. PageMaker, the company's most well-known product, ushered in the modern era of desktop computers such as the Macintosh seeing widespread use in the publishing industry. Paul Brainerd, the company's co-founder, coined the term desktop publishing to describe this paradigm. The company also originated the Tag Image File Format (TIFF) file format, widely used in the digital graphics profession.

Aldus was founded by Brainerd (who also served as chairman of the company's board), Jeremy Jaech, Mark Sundstrom, Mike Templeman, and Dave Walter. It was founded in Seattle in 1984 and was acquired by Adobe Systems a decade later.

The company was named after 15th-century Venetian printer Aldus Manutius.

== History ==
PageMaker was released in July 1985 and relied on Adobe's PostScript page description language. For output, it used the Apple LaserWriter, a PostScript laser printer. PageMaker for the PC was released in 1986.

In 1988, Aldus released an illustration program, FreeHand, which was licensed from Fontographer developer Altsys. FreeHand competed directly with Adobe Illustrator, which had been released a year earlier. The rivalry continued for years, even after Adobe acquired Aldus in 1994, because FreeHand was not included, but Adobe eventually acquired Freehand in 2005 with its acquisition of Macromedia. FreeHand MX was the last version offered by Adobe but is no longer sold or updated.

In early 1990, Aldus bought Silicon Beach Software, acquiring many consumer titles for the Macintosh, including SuperPaint, Digital Darkroom, SuperCard, Super3D, and Personal Press (later renamed Adobe Home Publisher). Silicon Beach was located in San Diego, California, and became the Aldus Consumer Division.

In 1993, Aldus bought After Hours Software and incorporated its products, TouchBase Pro and DateBook Pro, into the Aldus Consumer Division. In the same year, it acquired Company of Science and Art (CoSA).

In September 1994, Adobe purchased Aldus for $446 million. At that time, PageMaker was steadily losing market share to QuarkXPress, but Adobe was still five years from launching their own desktop publisher, InDesign. In 2001, after two major releases under Adobe, PageMaker was discontinued and users were urged to switch to the two-year-old InDesign.

Aldus developed the TIFF and OPI industry standards. The three founders of Visio Corporation left Aldus in 1990 to create the product which later became known as Microsoft Office Visio.

=== Company name ===
Paul Brainerd and the other Aldus partners named the company after Aldus Pius Manutius, a renowned fifteenth-century Venetian pioneer in publishing known for standardizing the rules of punctuation and also presenting several typefaces, including the first italic. Manutius later founded the first modern publishing house, the Aldine Press.

== Products ==
=== Print publishing ===
- PageMaker — A desktop publishing program

=== Prepress ===
- ColorCentral — An OPI server
- PressWise — A digital imposition program
- PrintCentral — A print output spooler
- TrapWise — A digital trapping program

=== Graphics ===
- FreeHand — A vector drawing program
- Gallery Effects
- Persuasion — A presentation program
- PhotoStyler— A bitmap image editor
- TextureMaker — A program for creating textures/patterns
- SuperPaint — Painting and vector drawing program
- Intellidraw — A powerful yet simple drawing program

=== Aldus Interactive Publishing/CoSA ===
- After Effects — A digital motion graphics and compositing program
- Hitchcock — A professional non-linear video editor, with titling and A/V transitions
- Fetch — A multimedia database

=== Aldus Consumer Division ===
(formerly Silicon Beach Software and After Hours Software)

- Digital Darkroom photo enhancement software
- Personal Press consumer desktop publishing software
- DateBook Pro — Calendar management software
- IntelliDraw — A vector drawing program
- Super3D — 3D modeling software
- SuperCard multimedia authoring environment
- TouchBase Pro — Contact management software
