= Comparison of word processor programs =

This is a comparison of word processor programs.

== General information ==
This table provides general information about selected word processor programs.

Program	Developer	Initial release	Platform	Latest release		License	Cost
Program	Developer	Initial release	Platform	Version	Date	License	Cost
AbiWord	AbiWord developer community, originally SourceGear Corporation	1999-05-19	AmigaOS	3.0.8	2026-02-18	GPL-2.0-or-later	No cost
AbiWord	AbiWord developer community, originally SourceGear Corporation	1999-05-19	BeOS	3.0.8	2026-02-18	GPL-2.0-or-later	No cost
AbiWord	AbiWord developer community, originally SourceGear Corporation	1999-05-19	BSD	3.0.8	2026-02-18	GPL-2.0-or-later	No cost
AbiWord	AbiWord developer community, originally SourceGear Corporation	1999-05-19	GNU/Linux	3.0.8	2026-02-18	GPL-2.0-or-later	No cost
AbiWord	AbiWord developer community, originally SourceGear Corporation	1999-05-19	macOS	3.0.8	2026-02-18	GPL-2.0-or-later	No cost
AbiWord	AbiWord developer community, originally SourceGear Corporation	1999-05-19	MorphOS	3.0.8	2026-02-18	GPL-2.0-or-later	No cost
AbiWord	AbiWord developer community, originally SourceGear Corporation	1999-05-19	SkyOS	3.0.8	2026-02-18	GPL-2.0-or-later	No cost
AbiWord	AbiWord developer community, originally SourceGear Corporation	1999-05-19	Unix	3.0.8	2026-02-18	GPL-2.0-or-later	No cost
AbiWord	AbiWord developer community, originally SourceGear Corporation	1999-05-19	Windows	3.0.8	2026-02-18	GPL-2.0-or-later	No cost
AbiWord	AbiWord developer community, originally SourceGear Corporation	1999-05-19	Zeta	3.0.8	2026-02-18	GPL-2.0-or-later	No cost
Apache OpenOffice Writer	Apache Software Foundation (Note: 2011 – present.)	2012-05-08	BSD	4.1.14	2023-02-27	Apache-2.0	No cost
Apache OpenOffice Writer	Apache Software Foundation	2012-05-08	GNU/Linux	4.1.14	2023-02-27	Apache-2.0	No cost
Apache OpenOffice Writer	Apache Software Foundation	2012-05-08	macOS	4.1.14	2023-02-27	Apache-2.0	No cost
Apache OpenOffice Writer	Apache Software Foundation	2012-05-08	Solaris/Illumos	4.1.14	2023-02-27	Apache-2.0	No cost
Apache OpenOffice Writer	Apache Software Foundation	2012-05-08	Unix	4.1.14	2023-02-27	Apache-2.0	No cost
Apache OpenOffice Writer	Apache Software Foundation	2012-05-08	Windows	4.1.14	2023-02-27	Apache-2.0	No cost
AppleWorks	Apple Inc.	1991	macOS	6.2.9	2004-01-14	Proprietary	Cost
AppleWorks	Apple Inc.	1991	Windows	6.2.2	2004-01-20	Proprietary	Cost
Applix Word	Vistasource Inc.		GNU/Linux	6.0		Proprietary	Cost
Applix Word	Vistasource Inc.	1992	Windows	6.0		Proprietary	Cost
Atlantis Word Processor	The Atlantis Word Processor Team	2000	Windows	5.0.5.5	2026-08-27	Proprietary	No cost and cost
Bean	James Hoover	2007-05-01	macOS	3.7.0	2024-05-16	Proprietary	No cost (Note: No cost since 3.0.)
Calligra Words	KDE	1998	BSD	4.0.1	2024-09-02	LGPL	No cost
Calligra Words	KDE	1998	GNU/Linux	4.0.1	2024-09-02	LGPL	No cost
Calligra Words	KDE	1998	macOS	4.0.1	2024-09-02	LGPL	No cost
Calligra Words	KDE	1998	Windows	4.0.1	2024-09-02	LGPL	No cost
Collabora Online Writer	Collabora	2019 (Note: The app uses LibreOffice kit technology and is based on Collabora Online for which development started in 2013.)	Android	26.04.3.1	2026-09-07	MPL-2.0	No cost, optional subscriptions with support available
Collabora Online Writer	Collabora	2021 (Note: Version 21.11. Using LibreOffice kit technology, development started in 2013.)	BSD	Build your own	Build your own	MPL-2.0	No cost, optional subscriptions with support available
Collabora Online Writer	Collabora	2019	ChromeOS	26.04.3.1	2026-09-07	MPL-2.0	No cost, optional subscriptions with support available
Collabora Online Writer	Collabora	2019	iOS	26.04.3	2026-09-08	MPL-2.0	No cost, optional subscriptions with support available
Collabora Online Writer	Collabora	2019	iPadOS	26.04.3	2026-09-08	MPL-2.0	No cost, optional subscriptions with support available
Collabora Online Writer	Collabora	2016 (Note: Version 1.0. Using LibreOffice kit technology, development started in 2013.)	Linux	Online server: 26.04.3.3	2026-09-14	MPL-2.0	No cost, optional subscriptions with support available
Collabora Online Writer	Collabora	2015 (Note: Version 4.4.)	Linux	Desktop app: 25.04.12	2026-09-21	MPL-2.0	No cost, optional subscriptions with support available
Collabora Online Writer	Collabora	2015	macOS	25.04.12	2026-09-21	MPL-2.0	No cost, optional subscriptions with support available
Collabora Online Writer	Collabora	2015	Windows	25.04.12	2026-09-21	MPL-2.0	No cost, optional subscriptions with support available
CopyDesk	Quark, Inc.	1991	macOS	7	2007	Proprietary	Cost
CopyDesk	Quark, Inc.	1991	Windows	7	2007	Proprietary	Cost
EZ Word	Andrew Project	1985	GNU/Linux	7.5	1996	MIT-CMU	No cost
EZ Word	Andrew Project	1985	Unix	7.5	1996	MIT-CMU	No cost
FrameMaker	Adobe Systems Incorporated	1986	macOS	15.0	2019-08-22	Proprietary	Cost
FrameMaker	Adobe Systems Incorporated	1986	Unix	15.0	2019-08-22	Proprietary	Cost
FrameMaker	Adobe Systems Incorporated	1986	Windows	15.0	2019-08-22	Proprietary	Cost
FreeOffice TextMaker	SoftMaker	2012?	macOS	1224	2025-03-18	Proprietary	No cost
FreeOffice TextMaker	SoftMaker	2012?	Linux	1224	2025-03-18	Proprietary	No cost
FreeOffice TextMaker	SoftMaker	2012?	Windows	1224	2025-03-18	Proprietary	No cost
Gobe Productive	Gobe Software	1998-08	BeOS	2.0.1	2000-02-29	Proprietary	Cost
Gobe Productive	Gobe Software	2001-12-12	Windows	3.04	2003-07-08	Proprietary	Cost
Google Docs	Google	2006 (Note: Development started 2006.)	Android (Note: Offline editing when used with Chrome or Edge web browser.)	Rolling	Rolling	Proprietary	Cost
Google Docs	Google	2006	ChromeOS (Note: Offline editing when used with Chrome web browser.)	Rolling	Rolling	Proprietary	Cost
Google Docs	Google	2006	iOS	Rolling	Rolling	Proprietary	Cost
Google Docs	Google	2006	Linux	Rolling	Rolling	Proprietary	Cost
Google Docs	Google	2006	macOS	Rolling	Rolling	Proprietary	Cost
Google Docs	Google	2006	Windows	Rolling	Rolling	Proprietary	Cost
Hangul	Haansoft	1989	Android	2022	2022	Proprietary	Cost
Hangul	Haansoft	1989	GNU/Linux	2022	2022	Proprietary	Cost
Hangul	Haansoft	1989	iOS	2022	2022	Proprietary	Cost
Hangul	Haansoft	1989	macOS	2022	2022	Proprietary	Cost
Hangul	Haansoft	1989	Windows	2022	2022	Proprietary	Cost
Ichitaro	JustSystems	1983-10	DOS	4.3	1989-12	Proprietary	Cost
Ichitaro	JustSystems	2004-12	GNU/Linux			Proprietary	Cost
Ichitaro	JustSystems	1995-07	macOS			Proprietary	Cost
Ichitaro	JustSystems	1993-04	OS/2			Proprietary	Cost
Ichitaro	JustSystems	1993-04	Windows	2022	2022-02-10	Proprietary	Cost
InCopy	Adobe Systems Incorporated	1999	macOS	21.5.1	2026-08	Proprietary	No cost
InCopy	Adobe Systems Incorporated	1999	Windows	21.5.1	2026-08	Proprietary	No cost
Jarte (Note: Free and Pro)	Carolina Road Software, LLC	2001-07	Windows	6.2	2018-04	Proprietary	No cost and cost
KOffice KWord	Reginald Stadlbauer, KDE	1998	GNU/Linux	2.3.3	2011-02-23	GPL; LGPL	No cost
KOffice KWord	Reginald Stadlbauer, KDE	1998	Windows	2.3.3	2011-02-23	GPL; LGPL	No cost
LibreOffice Writer	The Document Foundation	2011-01-25	BSD	26.2.3	2026-04-30	MPL-2.0	No cost
LibreOffice Writer	The Document Foundation	2011-01-25	GNU/Linux	26.2.3	2026-04-30	MPL-2.0	No cost
LibreOffice Writer	The Document Foundation	2011-01-25	macOS	26.2.3	2026-04-30	MPL-2.0	No cost
LibreOffice Writer	The Document Foundation	2011-01-25	Unix	26.2.3	2026-04-30	MPL-2.0	No cost
LibreOffice Writer	The Document Foundation	2011-01-25	Windows	26.2.3	2026-04-30	MPL-2.0	No cost
Lotus Symphony	Lotus Software	2008	GNU/Linux	3.0.1 FP2	2012-11-29	Proprietary	?
Lotus Symphony	Lotus Software	2008	macOS	3.0.1 FP2	2012-11-29	Proprietary	?
Lotus Symphony	Lotus Software	2008	Windows	3.0.1 FP2	2012-11-29	Proprietary	?
Lotus Word Pro	Lotus Development	1989 (Note: Originally Samna Ami Pro.)	Windows	9.8.6	2008	Proprietary	Cost
LyX	The LyX Project	1995	GNU/Linux	2.5.1	2026-04-23	GPL-2.0-or-later	No cost
Mellel	RedleX	2002	macOS	6.7.1r2	2026-07-26	Proprietary	Cost
Microsoft Word	Microsoft Corporation		Android	16	2021	Proprietary	Cost
Microsoft Word	Microsoft Corporation	1985	AT&T Unix PC			Proprietary	Cost
Microsoft Word	Microsoft Corporation	1986	Atari ST	1.05	1986	Proprietary	Cost
Microsoft Word	Microsoft Corporation	1983	DOS	6.0	1993	Proprietary	Cost
Microsoft Word	Microsoft Corporation		iOS	2.56	2021-12-12	Proprietary	Cost
Microsoft Word	Microsoft Corporation	1985	macOS	16	2021	Proprietary	Cost
Microsoft Word	Microsoft Corporation	1989	OS/2	5.5	1991	Proprietary	Cost
Microsoft Word	Microsoft Corporation	1990	SCO Unix	5.1	1991	Proprietary	Cost
Microsoft Word	Microsoft Corporation	1989	Windows	16	2021	Proprietary	Cost
Microsoft Word	Microsoft Corporation	1983-10-25	Xenix			Proprietary	Cost
Microsoft Works	Microsoft Corporation	1987-09-14	DOS	3.0b	1993	Proprietary	Cost
Microsoft Works	Microsoft Corporation	1988	macOS	4.0b	1994	Proprietary	Cost
Microsoft Works	Microsoft Corporation	1991	Windows	9	2007-09-28	Proprietary	Cost
NeoOffice Writer	Planamesa Software	2003-06-22	macOS	2022.7	2023-09-04	GPL	No cost
Nisus Writer	Nisus Software	1989	macOS	6.5	2001	Proprietary	Cost
Nisus Writer	Nisus Software	2003	macOS	4.3 (Express)	2022-09-01	Proprietary	Cost
Nisus Writer	Nisus Software	2007	macOS	3.3 (Pro)	2022-09-01	Proprietary	Cost
OnlyOffice Desktop Editors	Ascensio System SIA	2016	GNU/Linux	9.4.0	2026-05-19	AGPL-3.0-only	No cost
OnlyOffice Desktop Editors	Ascensio System SIA	2016	macOS	9.4.0	2026-05-19	AGPL-3.0-only	No cost
OnlyOffice Desktop Editors	Ascensio System SIA	2016	Windows	9.4.0	2026-05-19	AGPL-3.0-only	No cost
OpenOffice.org Writer	Sun Microsystems (Note: 1999 – 2009.); Oracle Corporation (Note: 2010 – 2011)	2002-05	BSD	3.3.0	2011-01-17	Apache-2.0	No cost
OpenOffice.org Writer	Sun Microsystems; Oracle Corporation	2002-05	GNU/Linux	3.3.0	2011-01-17	Apache-2.0	No cost
OpenOffice.org Writer	Sun Microsystems; Oracle Corporation	2002-05	macOS	3.3.0	2011-01-17	Apache-2.0	No cost
OpenOffice.org Writer	Sun Microsystems; Oracle Corporation	2002-05	Solaris/Illumos	3.3.0	2011-01-17	Apache-2.0	No cost
OpenOffice.org Writer	Sun Microsystems; Oracle Corporation	2002-05	Unix	3.3.0	2011-01-17	Apache-2.0	No cost
OpenOffice.org Writer	Sun Microsystems; Oracle Corporation	2002-05	Windows	3.3.0	2011-01-17	Apache-2.0	No cost
Pages	Apple Inc.	2005-01-11	iOS	13.0	2023-03-30	Proprietary	Cost
Pages	Apple Inc.	2005-01-11	macOS	13.0	2023-03-30	Proprietary	Cost
PolyEdit	PolySoft Solutions	1998	Windows	5.4	2010-04-07	Proprietary	Cost
StarOffice	Sun Microsystems	1994	GNU/Linux	9.0U3	2009-09-09	Proprietary	Cost
StarOffice	Sun Microsystems	1994	macOS	9.0U3	2009-09-09	Proprietary	Cost
StarOffice	Sun Microsystems	1994	Windows	9.0U3	2009-09-09	Proprietary	Cost
TeXmacs	Joris van der Hoeven	1996?	GNU/Linux	2.1.5	2026-03-12	GPL-3.0-or-later	No cost
TeXmacs	Joris van der Hoeven	1996?	macOS	2.1.5	2026-03-12	GPL-3.0-or-later	No cost
TeXmacs	Joris van der Hoeven	1996?	Windows	2.1.5	2026-03-12	GPL-3.0-or-later	No cost
Ted	Mark de Does	1999	Atari ST	2.23	2013-02-01	GPL-2.0-only	No cost
Ted	Mark de Does	1999	BSD	2.23	2013-02-01	GPL-2.0-only	No cost
Ted	Mark de Does	1999	GNU/Linux	2.23	2013-02-01	GPL-2.0-only	No cost
Ted	Mark de Does	1999	Unix	2.23	2013-02-01	GPL-2.0-only	No cost
TextEdit	Apple Inc.	1993? (Note: Approximate date. As part of NeXT's OPENSTEP which later became part of Mac OS X.)	macOS	1.21	2026-07-13	BSD-3-Clause	No cost
TextMaker	SoftMaker	2012-08	Android			Proprietary	Cost
TextMaker	SoftMaker	1987	DOS			Proprietary	Cost
TextMaker	SoftMaker	2002	FreeBSD			Proprietary	Cost
TextMaker	SoftMaker	2003-05?	GNU/Linux			Proprietary	Cost
TextMaker	SoftMaker	2022-06-08	iOS			Proprietary	Cost
TextMaker	SoftMaker	2018?	macOS	2026 rev1502	2026-08-11	Proprietary	Cost
TextMaker	SoftMaker	1994-04?	Windows	2026 rev1502	2026-08-11	Proprietary	Cost
WPS Office	Kingsoft	2012-03-23	Android	16.3.7	2022-07-22	Proprietary	Cost
WPS Office	Kingsoft	1988	DOS		Dropped	Proprietary	Cost
WPS Office	Kingsoft	2014	GNU/Linux	11.1.0.11664	2022-06-08	Proprietary	Cost
WPS Office	Kingsoft	2014	iOS	11.24.1	2022-07-14	Proprietary	Cost
WPS Office	Kingsoft	2019	macOS	4.2.1	2022-07-15	Proprietary	Cost
WPS Office	Kingsoft	1995?	Windows	11.2.0.11191	2022-07-05	Proprietary	Cost
WordPad	Microsoft Corporation	1995	Windows			Proprietary	Cost
WordPerfect	Corel Corporation	1980	OpenVMS	5.1		Proprietary	Cost
WordPerfect	Corel Corporation		Windows	2021	2021-05	Proprietary	Cost
Word processor	Developer	Initial release	Platform	Latest release		License	Cost
Word processor	Developer	Initial release	Platform	Version	Date	License	Cost

== Characteristics ==
This table gives characteristics of each word processor program.

Program	Grammar checker	Cross referencing	Bibliography	Graphic editing	Mail merging	Spell checker	Smartfont typography (Note: Advanced typography refers to either support for Apple Advanced Typography or advanced OpenType typography features and all OpenType layout tables or Graphite font technology.)	Math support	Conditional text	LTR/RTL
AbiWord	Yes	?	?	Yes	Yes	Yes	Yes	Yes	?	Yes
AppleWorks		?	?		Yes	Yes		Yes		?
Atlantis Word Processor	No	Yes	?	Yes	No	Yes	?	No	?	No
Apache OpenOffice Writer	Yes (Note: Via extensions.)	Yes	?	Yes	Yes	Yes	Yes (Note: Support for Graphite Font Technology from version 3.2.)	Yes	Yes	Yes
Bean	No	?	?	No	No	Yes				?
Collabora Online Writer	Yes	Yes	Yes	Yes	Yes (Note: Supported in Linux, macOS and Windows client applications, but not in Online or the Android, ChromeOS, iOS or iPadOS client applications)	Yes	Yes	Yes	Yes	Yes
CopyDesk	No	?	?		No	Yes				?
FrameMaker	No	Yes	?	Yes	No	Yes	No	Yes	Yes	?
GNU TeXmacs	No	Yes	Yes	Yes (Note: Only own graphics.)	No	Yes	Yes	Yes	Yes	?
Google Docs	Yes	Yes	Yes	Yes	Yes	Yes	Yes	Yes	Yes	Yes
Han/Gul	Yes	?	?	Yes	Yes	Yes	No	Yes		?
Ichitaro	Yes (Note: For Japanese.)	?	?			Yes	No			?
InCopy	No	?	?		No	Yes			Yes	?
Jarte	No	?	?	No	No	Yes			?	?
KWord	Yes	?	?	Yes	Yes	Yes	No			?
LibreOffice Writer	Yes (Note: 4 languages on default installation and over 30 languages via extensions.)	Yes	Yes	Yes	Yes	Yes	Yes	Yes	Yes	Yes
IBM Lotus Symphony	No	?	?	Yes	Yes	Yes	No			?
Lotus Word Pro	Yes	?	?	Yes	Yes	Yes	No			?
LyX	Yes	Yes	Yes	Yes		Yes	Yes	Yes	Yes	Yes
Mathematica	No	?	?	Yes	Yes	Yes	Yes	Yes		?
Mellel	Yes	Yes	Yes	Yes	No	Yes	Yes			Yes
Microsoft Word	Yes (Note: Support for additional languages available via language packs.)	Yes	Yes	Yes	Yes	Yes	No (Note: Partial support for some OpenType features in MS Word 2010, ie. ligatures, old-style figures, but not true small caps.)	Yes (Note: LaTeX, MS Equation and MathType.)	No	Yes
Microsoft Works	Yes	No	No	Yes	Yes	Yes	No	Yes	?	?
NeoOffice Writer	Yes	Yes	Yes	Yes	Yes	Yes				Yes
OnlyOffice Desktop Editors	Yes	No	Yes	Yes	Yes	Yes	No	Yes	No	No
OpenOffice.org Writer	Yes	Yes	?	Yes	Yes	Yes	Yes	Yes	Yes	Yes
Pages	Yes	No	Yes (Note: End notes/bibliography supported with EndNote X2 (third party))	Yes	No	Yes	Yes	Yes (Note: With third party add-ons: LaTeX or MathType.)		?
StarOffice Writer	No	?	?	Yes	Yes	Yes	Yes			?
Ted	No	?	?	No	No	Yes				?
TextEdit	Yes	?	?	Yes	No	Yes	Yes			?
TextMaker	Yes	Yes	Yes	Yes	Yes	Yes		Yes		Yes
WordPad	No					No				Yes
WPS Office	Yes	Yes	Yes	Yes	Yes	Yes	Yes	Yes	Yes	Yes
WordPerfect	Yes	Yes	Yes	Yes	Yes	Yes	No	Yes	No	?
Word processor	Grammar checker	Cross referencing	Bibliography	Graphic editing	Mail merging	Spell checker	Smartfont typography	Math support	Conditional text	LTR/RTL

== Operating system compatibility ==
This table shows the operating systems supported by the latest program version

Program	Windows	macOS	GNU/Linux	BSD	BeOS/Zeta	AmigaOS/MorphOS	UNIX	Other
AbiWord	Yes	No	Yes	Yes	No	No	No	QNX, Solaris
AppleWorks	Yes	Yes	No	No	No	No	No	No
Applix Word	Yes	No	Yes	No	No	No	No	No
Atlantis Word Processor	Yes	No	No	No	No	No	No	No
Apache OpenOffice Writer	Yes	Yes	Yes	Yes	No	No	Yes	OpenVMS
Bean	No	Yes	No	No	No	No	No	No
Collabora Online Writer	Yes	Yes	Yes	Yes	No	No	Yes	Android; ChromeOS iOS iPadOS
CopyDesk	Yes	Yes	No	No	No	No	No	No
EZ Word	No	No	Yes	No	No	No	Yes	No
FrameMaker	Yes	Yes (Note: Version 7.1 and earlier.)	No	No	No	No	Yes (Note: Version 8 and earlier.)	No
Gobe Productive	Yes	No	No	No	No	No	No	No
Google Docs	Yes	Yes	Yes	No	No	No	No	Android; ChromeOS iOS iPadOS
GNU TeXmacs	Yes	Yes	Yes	Yes	No	No	Yes	No
Groff	Yes	No	Yes	Yes	No	No	No	No
Han/Gul	Yes	Yes	Yes	No	No	No	No	No
Ichitaro	Yes	No	Yes	No	No	No	No	No
InCopy	Yes	Yes	No	No	No	No	No	No
Jarte	Yes	No	No	No	No	No	No	No
KWord	Yes (Note: Alpha.)	No	Yes	Yes	No	No	Yes	No
LibreOffice Writer	Yes	Yes	Yes	Yes	No	No	Yes	No
IBM Lotus Symphony	Yes	Yes	Yes	No	No	No	No	No
Lotus Word Pro	Yes	No	No	No	No	No	No	No
LyX	Yes	Yes	Yes	Yes	Yes	No	Yes	OS/2; Haiku; ChromeOS
Mathematica	Yes	Yes	Yes	No	No	No	Yes	No
Mellel	No	Yes	No	No	No	No	No	No
Microsoft Word	Yes	Yes	No	No	No	No	No	No
Microsoft Works	Yes	No	No	No	No	No	No	No
NeoOffice Writer	No	Yes	No	No	No	No	No	No
Nisus Writer	No	Yes	No	No	No	No	No	No
OnlyOffice Desktop Editors	Yes	Yes	Yes	No	No	No	No	No
OpenOffice.org Writer	Yes	Yes	Yes	Yes	No	No	Yes	OpenVMS
Pages	No	Yes	No	No	No	No	No	iOS
PolyEdit	Yes	No	No	No	No	No	No	No
StarOffice Writer	Yes	Yes	Yes	No	No	No	No	No
Ted	No	No	Yes	Yes	No	No	Yes	Atari ST
TextEdit	No	Included	No	No	No	No	No	No
TextMaker	Yes	Yes	Yes	No	No	No	No	Android
WPS Office	Yes	Yes	Yes	No	No	No	No	Android
WordPad	Included	No	No	No	No	No	No	No
WordPerfect	Yes	No	No (Note: Since 2000.)	No	No	No (Note: Last: AOS up to WP4.1 in 1987.)	No (Note: Since 1994.)	OpenVMS (Note: Can run unsupported Version 5.1.)
Word processor	Windows	Mac OS X	GNU/Linux	BSD	BeOS/Zeta	AmigaOS/MorphOS	UNIX	Other

== Import or open capabilities ==
This table gives a comparison of the file formats each program can import or open.

Program	HTML	LaTeX	ODF .odt	RTF	Word .doc	WordPerfect	OOXML .docx	SXW	UOF
AbiWord	Yes	No	Yes	Yes	Yes	Yes	Yes	Yes	No
Atlantis Word Processor	No	No	Yes	Yes	Yes	No	Yes	No	No
Apache OpenOffice Writer	Yes	No	Yes	Yes	Yes	Yes	Yes	Yes	Yes
Bean	Yes	Yes	Yes	Yes	Yes	No	Yes	No	No
Collabora Online Writer	Yes	No	Yes	Yes	Yes	Yes	Yes	Yes	Yes
CopyDesk	Yes	No	No	Yes	Yes	Yes			
FrameMaker	No	No	No	Yes	Yes	No			
GNU TeXmacs	Yes (Note: With MathML support.)	Yes (Note: With BibTeX support.)	No	No	No	No	No	No	No
Google Docs	No	No	Yes	No	Yes	No	Yes	No	No
Ichitaro	Yes	No	Yes	Yes	Yes	No	Yes	No	No
InCopy	No	No	No	Yes	Yes	No			
Jarte	No	No	No	Yes	Yes	No	Yes		
KWord	Yes	No	Yes	Yes	Yes	Yes	Yes	Yes	No
LibreOffice Writer	Yes	No	Yes	Yes	Yes	Yes	Yes	Yes	Yes
IBM Lotus Symphony	Yes	No	Yes	Yes	Yes	No	Yes	Yes	No
Lotus Word Pro	Yes	No	No	Yes	Yes	Yes	No	No	No
LyX	Yes	Yes	Yes	Yes	Depends (Note: With external program.)	No	No	No	No
Mathematica	Yes	Yes	No	Yes	No	No			
Microsoft Word	Yes	No	Yes	Yes	Yes	Yes	Yes	No	No
Microsoft Works	Yes	No	No	Yes	Yes	Yes	Yes	No	No
NeoOffice Writer	Yes	No	Yes	Yes	Yes	Yes	Yes	Yes	Yes
OnlyOffice Desktop Editors	No	No	Yes	Yes	Yes	No	Yes	No	No
OpenOffice.org Writer	Yes	No	Yes	Yes	Yes	Yes	Yes	Yes	Yes
Pages	No	No	No	Yes	Yes	No	Yes	No	
PolyEdit	No	No	No	Yes	Yes	Yes			
StarOffice Writer	Yes	No	Yes	Yes	Yes	Yes	Yes	Yes	
Ted	No	No	No	Yes	No	No	No	No	No
TextEdit	Yes	No	Yes	Yes	Yes	No	Yes		
TextMaker	Yes	No	Yes	Yes	Yes	Yes	Yes	Yes	No
WPS Office	Yes	No	Yes	Yes	Yes	Yes	Yes	No	No
WordPad	Yes	No	Yes	Yes	No	No	Yes	No	No
WordPerfect	Yes	No	Yes	Yes	Yes	Yes	Yes	No	No
Word processor	HTML	LaTeX	ODF .odt	RTF	Word .doc	WordPerfect	OOXML .docx	SXW	UOF

== Export or save capabilities ==
This table gives a comparison of the file formats each program can export or save. In some cases, omitting an export format (Microsoft Word's omission of WordPerfect export is the best known example) was a sales rather than a technical measure.

Program	HTML	LaTeX	ODF .odt	PDF	RTF	Word .doc	WordPerfect	OOXML .docx	UOF
AbiWord	Yes	Yes	Yes	Partial (Note: Linux ver.)	Yes	Yes	No (Note: Disabled.)	Yes	No
Atlantis Word Processor	Yes	No	No	Yes	Yes	Yes	No	Yes	No
Apache OpenOffice Writer	Yes	Yes	Yes	Yes	Yes	Yes	No	No	Yes
Bean	Yes	No	Yes	Yes	Yes	Yes	No	Yes	No
Collabora Online Writer	No	No	Yes	Yes	No	Yes	No	Yes	No
CopyDesk	Yes	No	No	Yes	Yes	Yes	Yes		
FrameMaker	Yes	No	No	Yes	Yes	No	No	No	No
GNU TeXmacs	Yes (Note: With MathML equations.)	Yes (Note: With BibTeX bibliography.)	No	Yes	No	No	No	No	No
Google Docs	No	No	Yes	Yes	No	No	No	Yes	No
Ichitaro	Yes	No	Yes	No	Yes	Yes	No	No	No
InCopy	No	No	No	Yes	Yes	No	No		
Jarte	Yes	No	No	Yes	Yes	Yes	No	No	No
KWord	Yes	Yes	Yes	Yes	Yes	Yes	Yes	No	No
LibreOffice Writer	Yes	Yes	Yes	Yes	Yes	Yes	No	Yes	Yes
IBM Lotus Symphony	Yes	No	Yes	Yes	Yes	Yes	No	No	No
Lotus Word Pro	Yes	No	No	No	Yes	Yes	Yes	No	No
LyX	Yes	Yes	Yes	Yes	Yes	No	No	No	No
Mathematica	Yes	Yes	No	Yes	Yes	No	No		
Microsoft Word	Yes	No	Yes	Yes	Yes	Yes	No	Yes	No
Microsoft Works	Yes	No	No	No	Yes	Yes	Yes	No	No
NeoOffice Writer	Yes	Yes	Yes	Yes	Yes	Yes	No	No	
OnlyOffice Desktop Editors	Yes	No	Yes	Yes	No	No	No	Yes	No
OpenOffice.org Writer	Yes	Yes	Yes	Yes	Yes	Yes	No	No	Yes
Pages	No	No	No	Yes	Yes	Yes	No	Yes	
PolyEdit	Yes	No	No	No	Yes	Yes	Yes		
StarOffice Writer	Yes	Yes	Yes	Yes	Yes	Yes	No	No	No
Ted	Yes	No	No	Yes	Yes	No	No	No	No
TextEdit	Yes	No	Yes	Yes	Yes	Yes	No	Yes	No
TextMaker	Yes	No	Yes	Yes	Yes	Yes	Yes	Yes	No
WPS Office	Yes	No	Yes	Yes	Yes	Yes	No	Yes	No
WordPad	No	No	Yes	No	Yes	No	No	Yes	No
WordPerfect	Yes	No	Yes	Yes	Yes	Yes	Yes	Yes	No
Word processor	HTML	LaTeX	ODF .odt	PDF	RTF	Word .doc	WordPerfect	OOXML .docx	UOF

== See also ==
- List of word processor programs
- Comparison of spreadsheet software
- Comparison of text editors
- Comparison of TeX editors
- Comparison of office suites
- Office suite
- Online office suite
