= List of word processor programs =

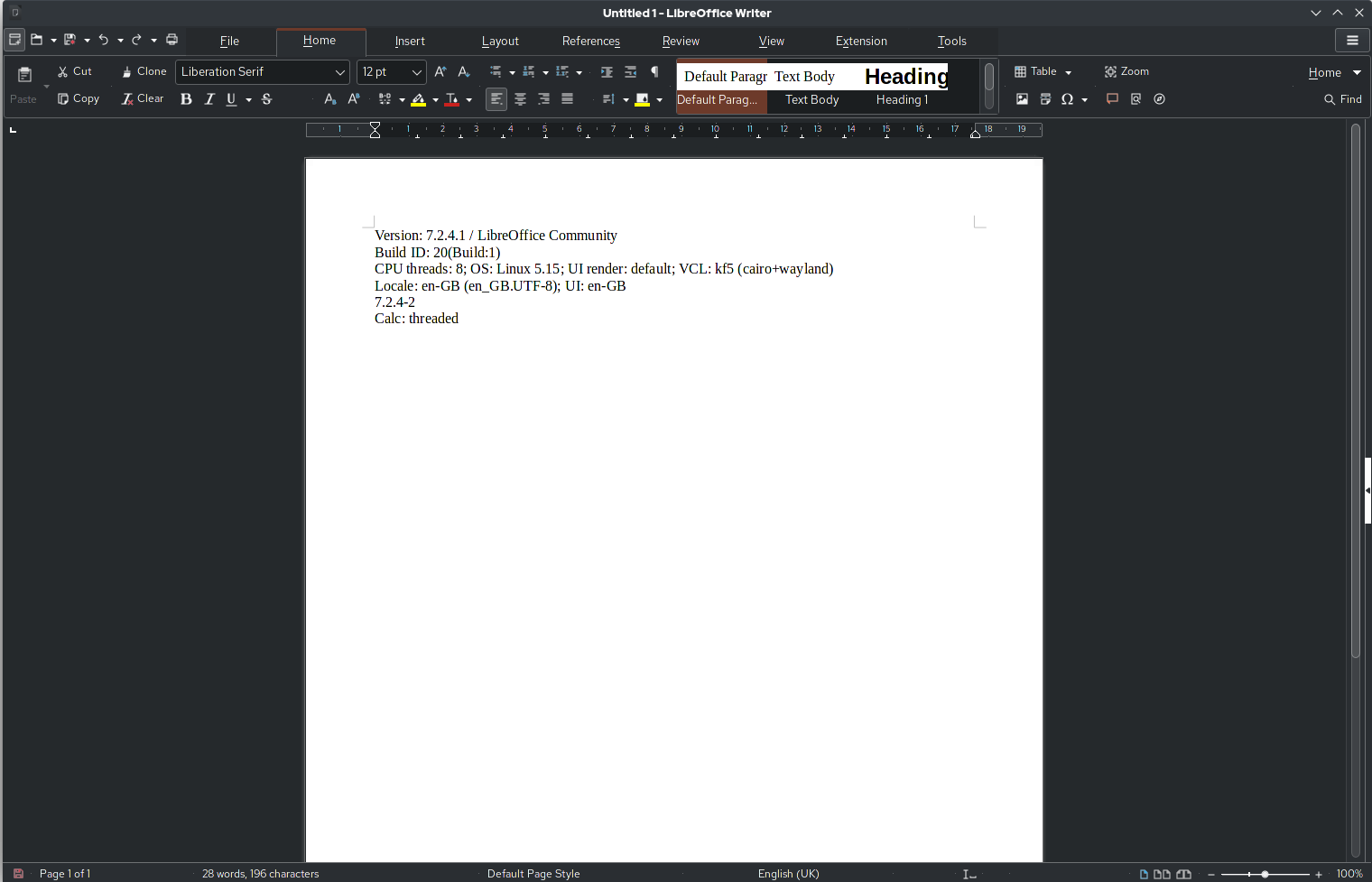
LibreOffice 7.2.4.1 Writer screenshot

The following is a list of notable word processor programs.

== Word processor programs ==
=== Free and open-source software ===
Title	Platform	Notes
AbiWord	AmigaOS, Linux, ReactOS, Solaris	
Apache OpenOffice Writer	Linux, macOS, Windows	
Calligra Words	Linux, Windows	
Collabora Online Writer	Android, ChromeOS, iOS, iPadOS, Linux, macOS, Online, Windows	
Docs	Web application	
GNU TeXmacs	Linux, macOS, Windows	Document preparation system
Groff	BSD, Linux	
LibreOffice Writer	Linux, macOS, Windows; Unofficial: Android, ChromeOS, FreeBSD, Haiku, iOS, iPadOS, OpenBSD, NetBSD, Solaris	
LyX	ChromeOS, Haiku, OS/2, Linux, macOS, UNIX, Windows	TeX frontend
TextEdit	macOS, Linux	
WordGrinder	Linux, macOS, Windows	

=== Freeware and proprietary suites ===
Title	Platform	Notes
Apple Pages	iOS, iPadOS, macOS, Online	
Atlantis Word Processor	Windows	
Baraha	Windows	
Bean	macOS	
DavkaWriter	macOS, Windows	
Final Draft	macOS, Windows	Screenplay/teleplay word processor
Adobe FrameMaker	Windows	Historically also on MacOS, NeXTSTEP, SunOS
Gobe Productive Word Processor	Windows, Linux	
Google Docs	Web application, Android, iOS	
Hangul	Windows, macOS, Linux	Also known as HWP
IA Writer	macOS, iOS, Windows, Android	
IBM SCRIPT	IBM VM/370	
IBM SCRIPT/VS	IBM z/VM, z/OS systems	
Ichitaro	Windows	Japanese word processor produced by JustSystems
Adobe InCopy	macOS, Windows	
iStudio Publisher	macOS	
Jarte	Windows	
JustSystems	Windows	
Mathematica	Linux, macOS, Windows	Technical and scientific word processing
Mellel	macOS, iPadOS	
Microsoft Word	Online, Windows, macOS, Android, iOS	
Nextcloud	Web application	Nextcloud Text / Nextcloud Office
Nisus Writer	macOS	
Nota Bene	Windows, macOS	
OnlyOffice	Linux, macOS, Windows, Android, iOS, Online	
Polaris Office	Android, Windows Mobile, Windows, macOS, iOS	
PolyEdit	Windows	
RagTime	Windows, macOS	
Scrivener	Windows, macOS, iOS (unofficial Linux)	
TechWriter	RISC OS	
Text Control	Windows	Word Processing SDK Library
TextMaker	Windows, Linux, Android, iOS	Part of SoftMaker Office
ThinkFree Office Write	Windows, macOS, Linux	
Ulysses	macOS, iPadOS, iOS	
WordPerfect	Windows, Linux	
WPS Writer	Windows, Linux, Android, iOS, macOS	Part of WPS Office
WriteOnline	Web application	

== Discontinued word processor programs ==
Title	Platform	Notes
1st Word/1st Word Plus	Atari ST and Acorn	
AM Jacquard Systems		running Type-Rite, its own proprietary software
Adobe Buzzword		
Aldus PageMaker	Windows, Mac OS, OS/2	Succeeded by Adobe InDesign
AppleWorks	Windows, Mac OS	Formerly ClarisWorks Word Processing, also an older and unrelated application for Apple II. Succeeded by iWork.
Amí	Windows	developed and marketed by Samna
Apple Writer	Apple II, Apple III	
SuperWriter	Apricot Portable	Built-in word processor in Apricot Computers devices
Authorea		word processor for students and researchers
AstroType		(later AstroComp)
AtariWriter	Atari 8-bit	
Bank Street Writer		
Bravo		
CEO	Data General's AOS and AOS/VS operating systems	
ChiWriter		
CPT Word Processors		
Cut & Paste		
DeskMate		"Text" component
DisplayWrite	PC DOS/MS-DOS, MVS-CICS, VM/CMS, OS/400	
Documents To Go	Android, iOS, Windows Mobile, Symbian	
DPCX	/DOSF	
EasyWriter	Apple II and MS-DOS (CP/M)	
Edit	Mac	
Edit.exe	MS-DOS	
Edlin	MS-DOS	
Electric Pencil	many	
Enable	MS-DOS	
Excellence	Amiga	
EZ Word		
The First XLEnt Word Processor		
FullWrite Professional	Mac	
geoWrite		component of GEOS
Gypsy		
Homepak	Commodore 64 and Atari	
IBM 3730		
IBM Lotus Symphony		
Interleaf		now called QuickSilver
JWPce		Japanese word processor, designed primarily for the English speaker who is reading or writing in Japanese. Last release was in 2005
KindWords	Amiga computers	
KWord		Last release was in 2011
Lexicon		
LocoScript		
Lotus Manuscript		
Lotus Word Pro	Windows	
MacWrite		
Magic Desk	Commodore 64	
Magic Wand	CP/M	Replaced by Peachtext
MindWrite	Mac	
MultiMate	MS-DOS	
NeoOffice	Mac OS	Discontinued in 2024
NewWord		Developed by NewStar Software Inc., this was a clone of WordStar
OfficeWriter	MS-DOS	Developed by Office Solutions, Inc.
PaperClip	Commodore 64 computers	
Pathetic Writer		Last release was in 2006
PC-Write		
Peachtext	CP/M, DOS	
Perfect Writer	CP/M, MS-DOS	
Personal QWERTY	MS-DOS	Developed by HFK Software
pfs:Write		Professional Write/IBM Writing Assistant
PROFS	IBM VM series	
Protext		
Q&A Write	DOS / Windows	
QText	DOS, Windows	
QuickOffice	Android, BlackBerry OS, HP webOS, iOS, Palm OS, Symbian	Discontinued since 2014
Samna Word	MS-DOS	Developed by Samna Corp.
Scripsit		
SimpleText	Apple System 7-9	
pfs:First Choice		lighter-weight version of the pfs suite; DOS
SpeedScript	Commodore 64 computers	
Spellbinder	MS-DOS	Developed by Lexisoft, Inc.
Sprint		
StarOffice Writer		
Taste		
Tasword		
TeachText	Mac	
Ted	Unix, Linux	Last release was in 2013
Textra	MS-DOS	Developed by Ann Arbor Software
TJ-2		
Trelby		Last release was in 2013
Type-Rite	A M Jacquard machines	
VizaWrite		
Volkswriter	DOS, OS-9	
Word Result	MS-DOS	Developed by Handic Software AB
WordMARC		
Works	Windows	Abandoned
WordPad	Windows	Included in Windows 95 to Windows 11. Discontinued in 2023.
WordStar	CP/M, Apple II, MS-DOS, Windows	
WordWriter 128	Commodore 128	
Write	Windows	Replaced by WordPad which was later abandoned
WriteNow	Mac / NeXT	
XyWrite	MS-DOS, Windows	
Zarnegar		with Persian/Arabic and Latin script support

== See also ==
- Comparison of word processors
- List of office suites
- List of text editors
- Online office suite
- Online spreadsheet
