= LibreOffice Writer =

Open-source word processor

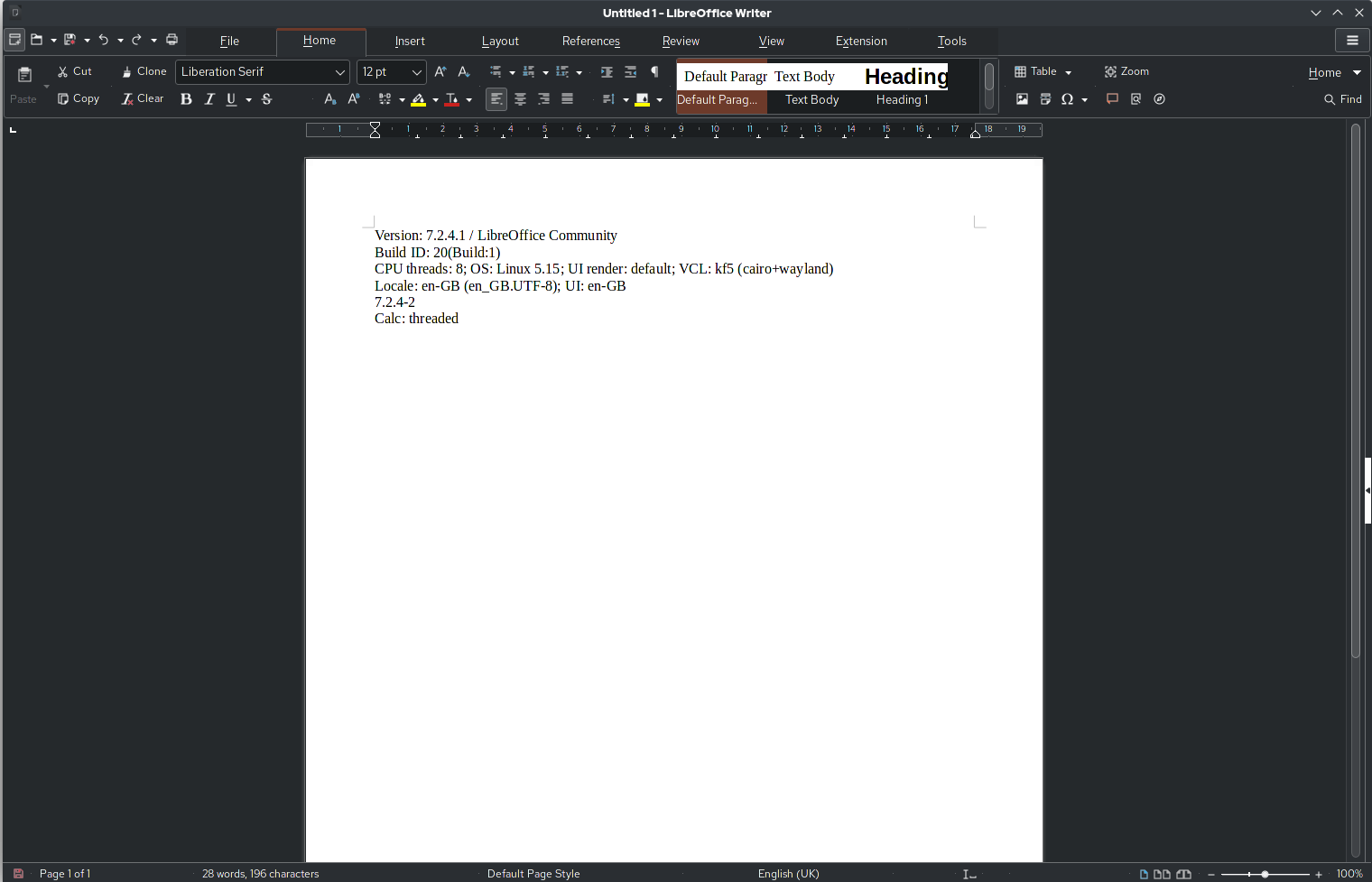
- LibreOffice Writer 7.2.4 (released in December 2021, running on Linux and KDE Plasma 5 with the Breeze icon set)
- Developer: The Document Foundation

Stable release(s)
- Fresh: 26.8 / 26 August 2026; Still: 26.2.5 / 24 July 2026

Preview release(s)
- 27.2.0.0.alpha0 / 16 June 2026
- Operating system: Cross platform
- Predecessor: OpenOffice.org Writer
- Type: Word processor
- License: MPLv2.0 (secondary license GPL, LGPLv3+ or Apache License 2.0)
- Website: libreoffice.org
- Repository: github.com/LibreOffice/core.git

LibreOffice Writer is the free and open-source word processor and desktop publishing component of the LibreOffice suite and is a fork of OpenOffice.org Writer. Writer is a word processor similar to Microsoft Word and Corel's WordPerfect with many similar features, and file format compatibility.

LibreOffice Writer is released under the Mozilla Public License v2.0.

As with the entire LibreOffice suite, Writer can be used across a variety of platforms, including Linux, FreeBSD, macOS and Microsoft Windows. There are community builds for many other platforms. Ecosystem partner Collabora uses LibreOffice upstream code and provides apps for Android, iOS, iPadOS and ChromeOS. LibreOffice Online is an online office suite which includes the applications Writer, Calc and Impress and provides an upstream for projects such as commercial Collabora Online.

== Features ==
Writer is capable of opening and saving to a number of formats, including OpenDocument (ODT is its default format), Microsoft Word's DOC, DOCX, RTF and XHTML.

- A spelling and grammar checker (Hunspell)
- Built-in drawing tools
- Built-in form building tools
- Built-in calculation functions
- Built-in equation editor
- Export in PDF format, generate hybrid PDF (a standard PDF with attached source ODF file) and create fillable PDF form
- The ability to import and edit PDF files.
- Ability to edit HTML, XHTML files visually without using code with WYSIWYG support
- Export in HTML, XHTML, XML formats
- Export in EPUB ebook format
- Contents, index, bibliography
- Document signing, password and public-key (GPG) encryption
- Change tracking during revisions, document comparison (view changes between two files)
- Database integration, including a bibliography database
- MailMerge
- Scriptable and Remote Controllable via the UNO API
- OpenType stylistic sets and character variants of fonts are not selectable from the menus, but can be specified manually in the font window. For example, fontname:ss06&cv03 will set the font to stylistic set 6 and chose character variant 3. This is based on the same syntax for Graphite font feature.

== Supported file formats ==
File format	Extension	Read/Write	Notes
AbiWord	ABW, ZABW	From 4.2	
AppleWorks (word processing)	CWK	From 4.1	Formerly called ClarisWorks
Apple Pages	PAGES	From 5.0	
AportisDoc (Palm)	PDB	Yes	Requires Java
BroadBand eBook	LRF	Yes	
DocBook	XML	Yes	
FictionBook	FB2	From 4.2	
Hangul WP 97	HWP	Yes	Newer "5.x" documents are not supported
HTML	HTM, HTML	Yes	
Ichitaro 8/9/10/11	JTD, JTT	Yes	
Lotus Word Pro	LWP	Yes	
MacWrite Pro 1.5	MW, MCW	From 4.1	
Microsoft Pocket Word	PSW	Yes	Requires Java
Microsoft RTF	RTF	Yes	
Microsoft Word 2003 XML (WordprocessingML)	XML	Yes	
Microsoft Word 4/5/6.0/95	DOC, DOT	Yes, writing up to 3.6	
Microsoft Word 97–2003	DOC, DOT	Yes	
Microsoft Word 2007-now	DOCX, DOTX, DOCM, DOTM	Yes	
Microsoft Works (word processing)	WPS, WPT	Yes	Microsoft Works for Mac formats since 4.1
Microsoft Write	WRI	From 5.1	
OpenDocument (word processing)	ODT, FODT, OTT,	Yes	
OpenOffice.org XML (word processing)	SXW, STW	Yes	
Plain text	TXT	Yes	Various encodings supported
Software602 (T602)	602, TXT	Yes	
StarOffice StarWriter 3/4/5	SDW, SGL, VOR	Dropped in 4.0 then added back in 5.3, up to 3.6	
Unified Office Format (word processing)	UOT	Yes	
WordPerfect	WPD	Yes	
WordPerfect Suite 2000/Office 1.0	WPS	Yes	
WriteNow 4.0	WN, NX^D	From 4.1	

== See also ==
- LibreOffice Calc
- Comparison of office suites
- Comparison of word processors
- List of word processors
- Comparison of desktop publishing software
- List of desktop publishing software
