= Bean (software) =

Word processor for Mac OS X

- Screenshot of Bean on Mac OS X
- Developer: James Hoover
- Release: 1 May 2007; 19 years ago
- Stable release: v3.7.8 / September 2, 2026; 2 months ago
- Written in: Objective-C
- Operating system: Mac OS X
- Type: Word processor
- License: Freeware
- Website: bean-osx.com

Bean is a word processor for Mac OS X. Originally free and open source software Bean became closed source at version 3. However, the Bean executable is still distributed free of charge. According to its author, James Hoover, Bean is not meant to replace Microsoft Word, but to be a lean word processor that is beautiful and user friendly. Many of Bean's operations are carried out by the underlying Cocoa framework of Mac OS X. The name Bean is a play on Cocoa and Java, two popular programming frameworks.

After the release of Bean 3.2.2 in November 2012, Hoover announced that "active development of Bean will cease. Bean will remain available for download at the bean-osx.com website. It may even be updated as necessary to keep the app running on future versions of OS X. Also, I'll try to continue technical support at the usual email address." Since this announcement, Hoover has provided further updates and fixes for Bean, with versions in 3.7.x series continuing to be published as of September 2026.

== Features ==
The design of Bean was heavily influenced by Marten Van De Kraats' article "Lean Word Processor Specifics". It is especially suitable for note taking or writing short articles because the program is highly responsive and starts almost instantly, while full-featured office suites take a much longer time to load. While Bean is not designed to compete with programs like LibreOffice Writer, OpenOffice.org Writer, or Microsoft Word, its feature set is complete enough to cover the needs of many users. Starting with version 3, Bean has a completely new user interface with an emphasis on simplicity.

Versions 3.1.1 and below are compatible with Apple's PowerPC-powered Macintoshes. As of 2024, modern versions of Bean are compatible with Intel and Apple Silicon-powered Macs.

Bean has the following features:

- A 'Live Word' count
- A 'Get Info' panel for 'In-Depth' statistics
- A zoom-slider to easily change the view scale
- An Inspector panel with many sliders
- Date-stamped backups
- Autosaving
- A page layout mode
- An alternate colors option (e.g., white text on blue)
- Selection of text by Text Style, Paragraph Style, Color, etc.
- A floating windows option (like Stickies has)
- Dictionary, word completion, etc.

As of version 3:

- Tabbed editing
- Ability to resize the width of the draft edit view within its window

It also includes full-screen mode, which only displays the text.

The following features are deliberately missing: footnotes, pre-defined text styles, floating graphics (but it does support in-line graphics).

=== File formats ===
Bean natively reads and writes these file formats:

- .rtf format (rich text)
- .rtfd format (Rich Text Format Directory, rich text with graphics)
- .bean format (identical to .rtfd)
- .txt format (Unicode and legacy)
- .html format (as source code)
- .webarchive format (Apple's web archive format)

Bean imports and exports these formats:

- .doc format (MS Word '97, minus images, margins, and page size)
- .docx format (Office Open XML, minus images and some formatting)
- .odt format (OpenDocument, minus images, margins, and page size)
- .xml format (Microsoft Word 2003 XML, minus images)

Bean can export all of the above formats to these formats:

- .html (web page format, minus images)
- .pdf
- .doc compatible (with images intact)
- .rtf (Rich Text Format, with images intact)

== See also ==
- List of word processors
- Comparison of word processors
- Office Open XML software
- OpenDocument software
