= QText =

DOS Hebrew-English word processing application

- Original author: Yitzhak Mintz
- Developer: Dvir Software
- Initial release: 1988; 37 years ago
- Written in: Turbo Pascal
- Type: Word processor

QText was a Hebrew-English word processing application for DOS in the late 1980s and early 90s.

== History ==
The program was developed by Dvir Software from kibbutz Dvir, Israel, and programmed in Turbo Pascal.QText was one of the first word processing applications that stored bi-directional text in logical order (by letter-typing-order and not visual order). In its DOS incarnations, the interface was text-based and did not offer WYSIWYG.

A Windows-compatible version of QText was released, but the brand faded out from the public as Windows gained popularity and Microsoft Word with Hebrew support became available. QText is no longer developed. The DOS version of QText used encoding starting at the code 128d for the Aleph character.

An early version of their web pages has a working (tested July 2011) link to a 30-day free trial of the Windows version.

== See also ==
- Comparison of word processors
- List of word processors
