= SXW =

SXW refers to:

- a file format of OpenOffice.org XML
- West Sussex, county in England, Chapman code
