= Lexicon (program) =

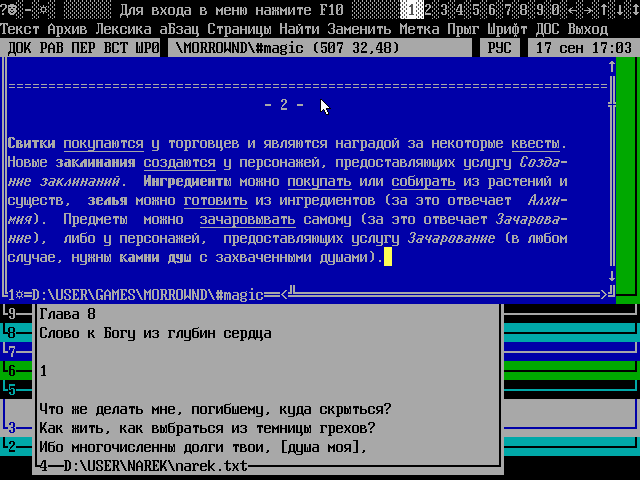
Screen shot

Lexicon was a text editor / word processor MS-DOS program that was extremely popular in the Soviet Union and Russia at the end of 1980s and in 1990s. Some estimate that Lexicon was illegally installed on 95% of all Russian PCs. The last version for MS-DOS was 1.4. Later Windows versions were developed, but they were not popular, due to easily available pirated copies of Microsoft Word.

Lexicon was originally developed at the Computing Center of the Academy of Sciences of the USSR by Ye. N. Veselov.

Lexicon could produce and edit plain text files; at the same time, it could enrich them with various formatting codes (which all started with the character 255 (0xFF)). Lexicon also included a spell checker.

Lexicon supported operations with linear and rectangular blocks; it also had convenient means for drawing tables with box drawing characters.

Lexicon could work with both osnovnaya (primary) and alternativnaya (alternative) character sets. It also included its own screen and printer fonts and keyboard drivers for use with non-russified computers.

== See also ==
- List of word processors
