= UOF =

UOF may refer to

- Uniform Office Format
- Université de l'Ontario français
