= WriteOnline =

Online word processor

- Developer(s): Crick Software
- Initial release: June 2, 2008; 16 years ago
- Stable release: 1.6.2.281 / May 1, 2011; 13 years ago
- Operating system: Microsoft Windows, Mac OS X
- Platform: Java
- Available in: UK English, US English
- Type: Online word processor
- License: Proprietary
- Website: WriteOnline product page

WriteOnline is an online word processor from Crick Software that incorporates writing support tools and is designed for schools and colleges.

== Features ==
WriteOnline is a WYSIWYG, page-view word processor which includes software speech, word prediction, Wordbars and a graphic organiser.

WriteOnline includes features to make it accessible for users with visual impairments, and also includes a switch accessible onscreen keyboard for users unable to use a standard keyboard.

WriteOnline is a Java application. It is available in UK English and US English.

== See also ==
- Word processors
- List of word processors
