= EZ Word =

EZ Word was a word processor developed as part of the Andrew User Interface System, a user-interface research project jointly done by IBM and the Carnegie Mellon University. Originally developed for UNIX systems, it was the first graphical word processor available for Linux.

Many people found the user interface quirky and difficult to learn. The program never really caught on, and the Andrew project stopped developing software in 1997. The last version of the AUIS suite, version 8.0, was never fully debugged, but is free software available under the MIT-CMU license.

== See also ==
- List of word processors
- Comparison of word processors
