= JWP =

JWP may refer to:

== Arts and entertainment ==
- JWP Joshi Puroresu, a Japanese wrestling promotion
- Jake White Project, an American band

== Organisations ==
- IUPAC/IUPAP Joint Working Party, who name chemical elements
- Jamhoori Wattan Party, a Pakistani political party

== People ==
- James Ward-Prowse (born 1994), English footballer
- John Wayne Parr (born 1976), Australian boxer and kickboxer

== Other uses ==
- JadeWeserPort, northern Germany
- Japanese Word Processor, a JWPce precursor
