= Debris linux =

Linux distribution

Debris Linux (previously BeaFanatIX, BFX) was a small Linux distro based on Ubuntu, Knoppix and Debian with GNOME as window manager. The ISO-file was about 200 MB in size and worked as a Live CD. It was also possible to install it on the hard drive.

== Origin ==
In 2005 Steven Watsky (maker of BeatrIX) halted updates to BeatrIX due to his health deteriorating. As a result, the BeatrIX community fell apart. Stephan Emmerich wanted to continue the project, but since this was no longer possible with BeatrIX kon, he decided to make a new distro, based on BeatrIX, called BeaFanatIX. This was later renamed to Debris Linux.

== Software ==
BeaFanatIX supplied following packages:

- GNOME, a windowmanager
- Mozilla Firefox, a webbrowser
- Beep, a mediaplayer
- AbiWord, a text processor which is compatible with Microsoft Office
- Gnumeric, a spreadsheet program
- Evolution, an e-mailclient

== Versions ==
- 2006.1 final
- 2006.2 beta 1
- 2006.2 beta 2
- 2006.2 beta 3,4,5 (not for public)
- 2006.2 beta 6 (23 October 2006)
- 2006.2 final
- 2006.2 revision 4 (September 2007)
- Debris 2.0 (2009)

== See also ==
- List of Linux distros
