= TextMaker =

Word processing software

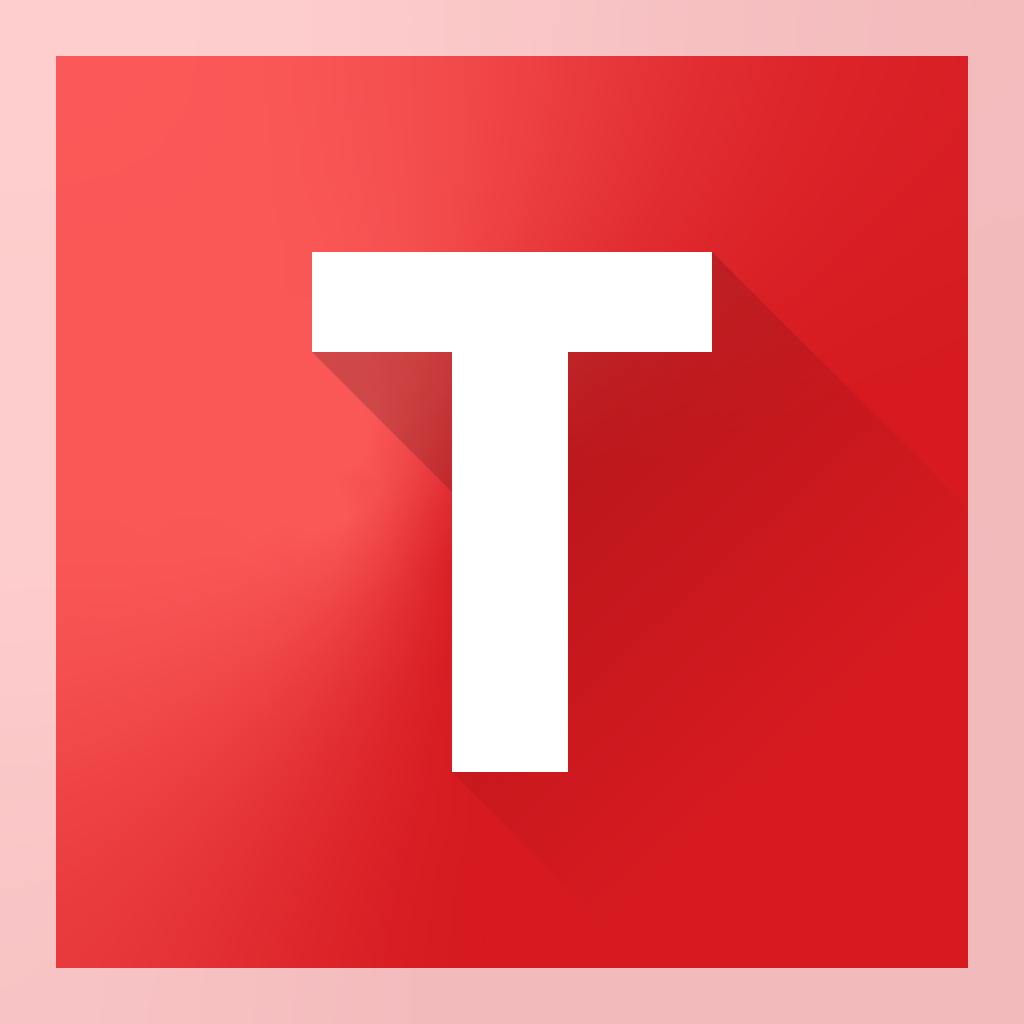
- Original author: SoftMaker
- Initial release: 1987; 39 years ago
- Stable release: 2024; 2 years ago
- Platform: Microsoft Windows, macOS, Linux, Android, iOS
- License: Proprietary (commercial or freeware/registerware)
- Website: www.softmaker.com/en/softmaker-office-textmaker

TextMaker is a word processor, which aims at utmost compatibility with Microsoft Word, its default document format is .docx.

It is sold as part of the SoftMaker office suite. Some reduced versions of TextMaker are released as freeware. It is available for Windows, MacOS, Linux, Android and iOS.

== Features ==
In contrast to Microsoft Word, SoftMaker TextMaker comes with some proprietary features like an object mode for working with frames or a simple built-in database functionality. It reads and writes its own document format (.tmd and .tmdx), Microsoft Word (.doc and .docx), OpenDocument (.odt), Pocket Word (.psw, .pwd), Rich Text Format (.rtf), HTML 4.0 (.htm), and plain text files (.txt). It can also open OpenOffice.org XML (.sxw) files.

Multilingual features include a five language translation dictionary, a thesaurus in ten languages, spell checking in 17, hyphenation in 29, and user interface in 31 languages.

VBA-compatible scripting is supported through SoftMaker's scripting language, called BasicMaker, which is part of its SoftMaker Office suite for Windows.

For mobile use, TextMaker can be run from a USB stick without changing any registry or system files of the host PC.

The subscription-version of TextMaker 2024 includes a connection to ChatGPT, which summarizes texts on request, makes suggestions for improvements or generates texts according to hopefully appropriately formulated prompts. It translates documents with DeepL and preserves the text formatting completely.

== History ==
Development of TextMaker started in 1987 under MS-DOS.

It was available as TextMaker 2002 for Sharp Zaurus, as TextMaker 2006 for FreeBSD and Handheld PC 2000, as TextMaker 2010 for Pocket PCs with Windows CE 4.2. It is the only word processor supporting all of these systems. Furthermore, it provides the same feature set on all platforms.

It has been available for Android since 2021 and a year later for iOS. The mobile versions offer the full functionality of the desktop versions, with the user interface tailored for touchscreens. Optimized both for small smartphone screens and bigger tablet screens.

== See also ==
- List of word processors
- Comparison of word processors
- Office Open XML software
- OpenDocument software
