= Uot =

.uot refers to:

- .uot, extension for Uniform Office Document

UOT or UoT may refer to:

- University of Tartu, public university in Tartu, Estonia
- University of Tennessee, public university in Knoxville, Tennessee, US
- University of Texas, public university in Austin, Texas
- University of Toronto, public university in Toronto, Canada
- University of Tripoli, a public university in Tripoli, Libya
