= Ted (word processor) =

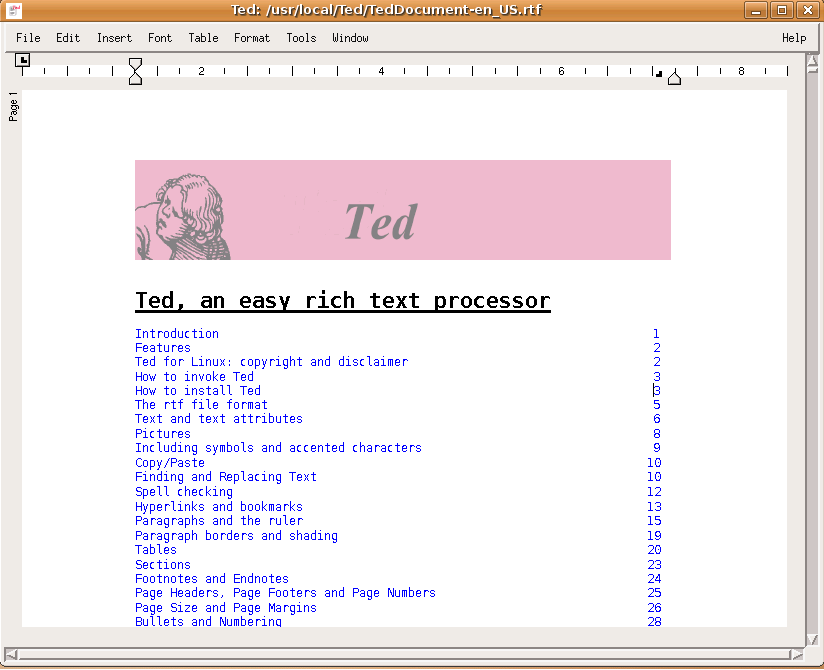
- Screenshot of Ted 2.17
- Developer: Mark de Does
- Release: 9 November 1998; 27 years ago; or 10 October 1998
- Stable release: 2.23 / 1 February 2013
- Written in: C
- Operating system: Unix, Linux
- Size: 3.0 Mb (.deb package)
- Type: Word processor
- License: GPL-2.0-only

Ted is a lightweight free software word processor for the X Window System, and runs on Linux and other Unix-like systems. Developed primarily by Mark de Does, it's licensed under the terms of the GNU General Public License (GPL-2.0-only), and has been translated into several languages.

While Ted is small in size, it is a full-featured and fast word processor, making it ideal for older computers and embedded systems.

It saves files in a Microsoft Word-compatible rich text format, and has support for headers, footers, tables, different fonts, text alignment, and other features common in word processors. The built-in spellchecker is not automatic, whereby incorrect words are not highlighted when typing.

Until version 2.17, Ted used the Motif toolkit exclusively for widget rendering. LessTif also worked. The current version (2.23) uses the GTK+ toolkit by default. It can still be built with Motif or LessTif, if desired.

The Ted package had been included in Debian ("etch"), in Ubuntu up to Hardy Heron, and Gentoo Linux, and is available from the official homepage in various package formats.

== See also ==
- List of word processors
- Comparison of word processors
