= Jarte =

Word processor software for Microsoft Windows

- Jarte on Windows XP
- Developer: Carolina Road Software
- Final release: 6.2 (April 22, 2018; 8 years ago) [±]
- Operating system: Microsoft Windows
- Type: Word processor
- Website: www.jarte.com

Jarte is a word processor for users of Microsoft Windows, based on the WordPad engine, produced by Carolina Road Software. In terms of market appeal, Jarte is a lighter alternative to the feature laden Microsoft Word. The standard version of Jarte is offered free of charge, while a Jarte Plus, originally a paid enhanced version, has also been made free. The (formerly) purchasable version offers a variety of extra features, including Auto-Correct and Auto-Outline. In most other respects, Jarte Plus is the same as the freeware version. The software's official support page has stated since between February and June 2020 that support is no longer available and there will be no further updates. Jarte Plus was made free during the same window.

== Features ==
Both versions are provided with a spell checker. During the installation process, Jarte allows for the option of installing multiple language functionality that includes French, German, Italian and Spanish. In keeping with its attempt to provide universal appeal, Jarte also offers American, British and Canadian English spell-checking. While Jarte is often marketed as a WordPad replacement, it can additionally create and save; tables, strikeout, superscript, subscript, "extra" colors, text background colors (highlighting), numbered lists, right or left indent, quasi-hypertext and URL linking, and various line spacings, — all of which WordPad can read, interpret, and save.

Jarte bears a resemblance to TextEdit. It has three selectable basic layouts: mini, compact, and full, each with user-selectable menus, bars, panels, and so forth. One form looks similar to WordPad's layout. Jarte offers 'tabbed' functionality. It supports touch screen gestures on Windows 8 and above.

== File formats ==
Jarte reads and writes RTF and TXT files. It can also read and write Microsoft Word DOC files through document converters—mswrd6.wpc for Word 95 files and mswrd8.wpc for Word 97-2003 files. These converters are no longer included in Windows and must be downloaded separately. For reading (but not writing) DOCX files, the Microsoft Office Compatibility Pack must be installed, which is being retired in April 2018. Jarte is also capable of exporting files as HTML or PDF.

== Compatibility ==
As of January 2018, Jarte is available for Windows Operating systems (XP, Vista, 7, 8, 8.1, and 10), but can be used on Linux-based systems using Wine. Jarte works on both 32-bit and 64-bit editions of Windows.

== See also ==
- List of word processors
- List of portable software
- Comparison of word processors
- Office Open XML software
