= PolyEdit =

- Developer(s): PolySoft Solutions
- Stable release: 5.4 / April 7, 2010; 15 years ago
- Preview release: 6.0 Beta 1 / March 25, 2010; 15 years ago
- Operating system: Microsoft Windows
- Type: Word processor
- License: Proprietary
- Website: polyedit.com

PolyEdit is a compact multipurpose word processor and text editor for Microsoft Windows. It has been developed by PolySoft Solutions since 1998.

The program can be downloaded as PolyEdit Lite, which is free for home use. A paid-for version is also available.

PolyEdit can compress and encrypt documents saved in its native Enhanced Text Format (*.etf), using the Blowfish and SHA-1 algorithms. It can embed OLE objects and images (the latter including PNG files, JPEGs, BMPs, GIFs, and icons). The program supports basic tables and multiple columns, as well as hyperlinks, and features syntax highlighting for C++ and other programming languages. Another feature is PolyEdit's email client, which has a simple address book with an import feature.

== Reception ==
PolyEdit has been criticized by several reviewers for lacking some standard word processing features such as support for footnotes and PDF export.

== See also ==
- List of word processors
- Comparison of word processors
- List of text editors
- Comparison of text editors
