= Andrew Project =

Computing project at Carnegie Mellon University

The Andrew Project was a distributed computing environment developed at Carnegie Mellon University beginning in 1982. It was an ambitious project for its time and resulted in an unprecedentedly vast and accessible university computing infrastructure. The project was named after Andrew Carnegie and Andrew Mellon, the founders of the institutions that eventually became Carnegie Mellon University.

== History ==
The Information Technology Center, a partnership of Carnegie Mellon University (CMU) and the International Business Machines Corporation (IBM), began work on the Andrew Project in 1982. In its initial phase, the project involved both software and hardware, including wiring the campus for data and developing workstations to be distributed to students and faculty at CMU and elsewhere. The proposed "3M computer" workstations included a million pixel display and a megabyte of memory, running at a million instructions per second. Unfortunately, a cost on the order of US$10,000 (equivalent to $24,000 in 2023) made the computers beyond the reach of students' budgets. The initial hardware deployment in 1985 established a number of university-owned "clusters" of public workstations in various academic buildings and dormitories. The campus was fully wired and ready for the eventual availability of inexpensive personal computers.

Early development within the Information Technology Center, originally called VICE (Vast Integrated Computing Environment) and VIRTUE (Virtue Is Reached Through Unix and Emacs), focused on centralized tools, such as a file server, and workstation tools including a window manager, editor, email, and file system client code.

Initially the system was prototyped on Sun Microsystems machines, and then to IBM RT PC series computers running a special IBM Academic Operating System. People involved in the project included James H. Morris, Nathaniel Borenstein, James Gosling, and David S. H. Rosenthal.

The project was extended several times after 1985 in order to complete the software, and was renamed "Andrew" for Andrew Carnegie and Andrew Mellon, the founders of the institutions that eventually became Carnegie Mellon University. Mostly rewritten as a result of experience from early deployments, Andrew had four major software components:

- The Andrew Toolkit (ATK), a set of tools that allows users to create and distribute documents containing a variety of formatted and embedded objects,
- The Andrew Messaging System (AMS), an email and bulletin board system based on ATK, and
- The Andrew File System (AFS), a distributed file system emphasizing scalability for an academic and research environment.
- The Andrew Window Manager (WM), a tiled (non-overlapping windows) window system that allowed remote display of windows on a workstation display. It was one of the first network-oriented window managers to run on Unix as a graphical display. As part of the CMU's partnership with IBM, IBM retained the licensing rights to WM. WM was meant to be licensed under reasonable terms, which CMU thought would resemble a relatively cheap UNIX license, while IBM sought a more lucrative licensing scheme. WM was later replaced by X11 from Project Athena at the Massachusetts Institute of Technology. Its developers, Gosling and Rosenthal, would next develop the NeWS (Network extensible Window System).

AFS moved out of the Information Technology Center to Transarc in 1988. AMS was fully decommissioned and replaced with the Cyrus IMAP server in 2002.

== The Andrew User Interface System ==
After IBM's funding ended, Andrew continued as an open source project named the Andrew User Interface System. AUIS is a set of tools that allows users to create and distribute documents containing a variety of formatted and embedded objects. It is an open-source project run at the Department of Computer Science at CMU. The Andrew Consortium governs and maintains the development and distribution of the Andrew User Interface System.

The Andrew User Interface System encompasses three primary components. The Andrew User Environment (AUE) contains the main editor, help system, user interface, and tools for rendering multimedia and embedded objects. The Andrew Toolkit (ATK) contains all of the formattable and embeddable objects, and allows a method for developers to design their own objects. ATK allows for multi-level object embedding, in which objects can be embedded in one another. For example, a raster image object can be embedded into a spreadsheet object. The Andrew Message System (AMS) provides a mail and bulletin board access, which allows the user to send, receive, and organize mail as well as post and read from message boards.

As of version 6.3, the following were components of AUIS:

=== Applications ===
- Word processor (EZ)
- Drawing Editor (Figure)
- Mail and News Reader (Messages)
- Mail and News Sender (SendMessage)
- Font Editor (BDFfont)
- Documentation Browser (Help)
- Directory Browser (Bush)
- Schedule Maintainer (Chump)
- Shell Interface/Terminal (Console, TypeScript)
- AUIS Application Menu (Launch)
- Standard Output Viewer (PipeScript)
- Preferences Editor (PrefEd)

=== Graphical and interactive editors ===
- Equation Insert (EQ)
- Animation Editor (Fad)
- Drawing Editor (Figure)
- Insert Layout Insert (Layout)
- Display Two Adjacent Inserts (LSet)
- Extension and String Processing Language (Ness)
- Display and Edit Hierarchies (Org)
- Page Flipper (Page)
- Monochrome BMP Image Editor (Raster)
- Spreadsheet Insert (Table)
- Text, Document, and Program Editor (Text)

== Wireless Andrew ==
Wireless Andrew was the first campus-wide wireless Internet network. It was built in 1993, predating Wi-Fi branding.

Wireless Andrew is a 2-megabit-per-second wireless local area network connected through access points to the wired Andrew network, a high-speed Ethernet backbone linking buildings across the CMU campus. Wireless Andrew consists of 100 access points covering six buildings on the campus. The university tested the setup with over 40 mobile units before allowing general use by researchers and students in February 1997.
