= Quark CopyDesk =

- Developer(s): Quark, Inc.
- Initial release: 1991; 34 years ago
- Stable release: 9 / 2011; 14 years ago
- Operating system: Mac OS X, Microsoft Windows
- Type: Word processors
- Website: quark.com/products/quarkxpress-copydesk

Quark CopyDesk (often only CopyDesk) is a professional word processing software product made by Quark, Inc.

There are two versions of Quark CopyDesk available: One is sold with Quark's editorial system QPS and one is sold standalone. Both versions are tightly integrated with QuarkXPress.

== Functions ==
Quark CopyDesk is primarily used by newspapers and magazines to write, edit and style text (copy). The software includes standard word processing features such as spell check, track changes and word count. Its integration with QuarkXPress allows exact copy fitting information and previews, which ensures the editor to see whether the text fits correctly in the corresponding QuarkXPress layout and to control hyphenation.

Since 1999, InCopy from Adobe is a direct competitor to Quark CopyDesk, which was launched in 1991.

Quark CopyDesk offers three viewing modes: Story, Galley and WYSIWYG. The Story mode displays the story text across the screen's entire width without formatting. This provides an interface for users more comfortable with traditional word processors to read and edit copy and allows text to be seen larger and in a different font than it would appear in the layout.

The Galley mode also displays the text without formatting, but shows style sheets that have been applied to the copy and also the correct hyphenation and line endings. Galley mode shows copy as one column wide and - via visual markers - also shows jumps and column breaks.

However, the Galley mode lacks a true representation of the design and layout – these features are reserved for the WYSIWYG mode. This view shows a page representation and the text with all its formatting. However, the editor can only edit text or add pictures, which is also a substantial benefit as it prevents editors from deliberately or accidentally altering the layout itself.

== History ==
- Quark CopyDesk 1.0 (1991): Support for QuarkXPress 3, Mac only version
- Quark CopyDesk 2.0 (1998): Support for QuarkXPress 4, adds Windows support
- Quark CopyDesk 2.2 (2003): Support for QuarkXPress 5
- Quark CopyDesk 3.0 (2004): Support for QuarkXPress 6, supports Mac OS X
- Quark CopyDesk 3.5 (2006)
- Quark CopyDesk 3.6 (2007)
- Quark CopyDesk 7 (2007): Support for QuarkXPress 7, picture editing, redlining, Mac Intel version
- Quark CopyDesk 8 (2008): Support for QuarkXPress 8
- Quark CopyDesk 9 (2011): Support for QuarkXPress 9

== See also ==
- Quark Publishing System
