= Conditional text =

Text for inclusion in some versions of a document

Conditional text is content within a document that is meant to appear in some renditions of the document, but not other renditions.

For example, a writer can produce Macintosh and Windows versions of the same software manual by marking Macintosh-specific content as "Macintosh only" and Windows-specific content as "Windows only." Everything that is not marked for one platform or the other, appears in the manuals for both platforms.

In Structured authoring standards such as DITA, conditional text is implemented through profiling attributes such as audience, platform and product, which allow content to be filtered or flagged at publishing time.

== See also ==
- Single-sourcing
- Comparison of word processors
