= WordGrinder =

Word processing application

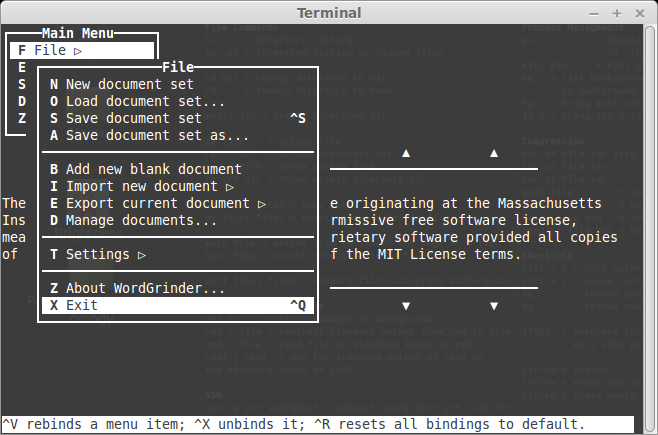
- Original author: David Given
- Initial release: October 14, 2007; 18 years ago
- Stable release: 0.8 / 24 October 2020; 5 years ago
- Written in: C, Lua
- Operating system: Linux, Windows, macOS
- License: MIT License
- Website: cowlark.com/wordgrinder/
- Repository: github.com/davidgiven/wordgrinder

WordGrinder is a word processing application for the Unix terminal or Windows console. WordGrinder focuses on creating a minimalist word processing environment in order to reduce distractions for the end user. The application's author wrote the program for his own use while working on a novel. Files are saved in a text-based file format that includes options and styles with the document (versions prior to v0.7 used a binary file format instead of plain text).
