= Mellel =

Word processor

- Developer: RedleX
- Stable release: 6.7.1r2 / 26 July 2026; 2 months ago
- Written in: Objective-C Cocoa
- Operating system: Mac OS X
- Type: Word processing
- License: Proprietary
- Website: www.mellel.com

Mellel (מלל, the Hebrew for "text") is a word processor for Mac OS X, developed since 2002 and marketed as especially suited for technical and academic writers, and for writers with long, complex documents. It is made by Mellel AAR, a small software company. New features are added to the program every few months, many of which come from user suggestions. Its closest competitor is Nisus Writer Pro.

One feature present in Mellel is its multilanguage support. Languages with non-Latin alphabets, including Arabic, Syriac, Hebrew, Greek, Korean or Persian, for example, are handled well due to the fact that Mellel sports its own text engine, that is not reliant on macOS text support, and in addition support for Unicode and OpenType fonts.

Mellel also presents a feature set suitable for working with long and complex documents, in order to match the needs of scholars and technical writers. Mellel has a distinctive way of handling footnotes and endnotes, allowing creation of numerous "streams" of notes in a single document. This feature allows inclusion of three or more footnote types at the same time (e.g., editor notes, translator notes, endnotes, regular notes, etc.). Cross-references are also dealt with in a singular way by Mellel. The software offers support for Outline, based on headings in the document text. With Mellel 4.0 the software added an Index tool which according to the company website "rivals dedicated Index applications". Mellel has a unique way of handling styles, which are also organised as part of a style set, that can be utilised by multiple documents. Its Replace Styles feature is able to reformat a large amount of text scattered throughout a document (a feature also present in OpenOffice.org Writer and in Nisus Writer for Mac OS Classic).

Due to its approach to implementing many of its features, Mellel originally lacked full compatibility with standard word processors, but—as of July 2020—Mellel exports accurately to .docx and to ePub according to the developer's website. From the outset, Mellel has exported accurately to .pdf.

Mellel provides integration with Bookends and Sente, bibliographical tools for managing citations, including Live Bibliography (instant updates of Bibliography when one adds a citation).

A version of Mellel is available for the iPad.

Owners of Mellel announced in January 2011 that they will give free updates for life for anyone who will purchase the application outside the Mac App Store. As per the company, this policy was dropped in February 2014. With the release of Mellel 4.0 Mellel AAR, the developer, announced that a for fee upgrade policy was re-instated (two years of free updates). This policy does not apply to users who've purchased Mellel during the "lifetime" period.

The current version of Mellel, 6.0, reportedly supports MacOS 10.15.x.

== Reception ==
Macworld gave version 1.8.2 a rating of three out of five and wrote: "If you are an outlining addict or an academic who needs great note options, and if Mellel's quirky styles don't bother you, then Mellel is a great deal." TechRadar reviewed version 2.5 and gave it a rating of three out of five, writing: "Worth a look for academic and technical writers, but beware the clunky interface and steep learning curve". TechSpot reviewed version 3.2.3 and called it the most powerful word processor for the Mac OS. Download.com reviewed version 3.3.8 and concluded: "Mellel for Mac is best suited for students, academics, researchers, and other professionals that find themselves writing long papers containing a dozen text styles and hundreds of citations and references."

== See also ==
- List of word processors
- MathMagic equation editor for Mellel, supporting automatic baseline alignment
- MathType equation editor for Mellel.
- Bookends bibliographic program, tightly integrated with Mellel
