= Hangul (word processor) =

South Korean computer program

Hangul 한글
- Hangul 2010 for Windows
- Developer: Hancom Inc.
- Release: 1988; 38 years ago
- Stable release: Hangul Office 2024
- Operating system: Microsoft Windows macOS; Linux iOS; Android
- Standards: Office Open XML; OpenDocument
- Available in: Korean, English
- Type: Word processor
- License: Proprietary (except Linux)
- Website: Official website

Hangul (Korean: 한글) is a proprietary word processing application published by the South Korean company Hancom Inc. Hangul's specialized support for the Korean written language has gained it widespread use in South Korea, especially by the government. Hancom has published their HWP binary format specification online for free.

The software's name is derived from the Korean word Hangul for the alphabet used to write Korean. In Korean, the software's name is officially stylised (ᄒᆞᆫ글) using the obsolete letter arae a in place of the modern a in hangul, and is also frequently referred to as Arae-A Hangŭl (아래아한글) or Han/gŭl (한/글).

Haansoft was on the verge of bankruptcy after the release of its 2002 version, due to the widespread use of illegal copies. A campaign to support the development of Korean software and promote the purchase of legal copies of Hangul allowed Haansoft to recover.

== Versions ==
Previous versions have included:

=== Windows ===
- Hangul 3.0, 3.0a, 3.0b (1995)
- Hangul 96, International, Japanese (1996)
- Hangul 97, 97 strengthen, 815 special edition (1998)
- Hangul Wordian, Hangul for Kids (2000)
- Hangul 2002 (2001, widely used for government e-document system)
- Hangul 2004 (2003)
- Hangul 2005 (2004)
- Hangul 2007 (2006)
- Hangul 2010 (2010)
- Hancom Office 2010 SE (English Edition)
- Hangul 2014 (2013)
- Hangul NEO (2016)
- Hangul 2018 (2017)
- Hangul 2020 (2019)
- Hangul 2022 (2021)
- ThinkFree (2017)
- Hangul 2024 (2023)

=== macOS ===
- Hangul 2006 (2006) : PPC binary
- Hangul 2014 for Mac (2013)

=== Linux ===
- Hangul X R4 (1999, bundled in Mizi Linux 1 and 1.1)
- Hangul X R5 (2000, included in Hancom Office 2)
- Hangul 2008 Linux (2008, included in Hancom Office 2008 Linux)
