= Adobe InCopy =

Professional word processor made by Adobe Inc

- Adobe InCopy 2021 running on macOS Big Sur
- Developer: Adobe Systems
- Release: October 1999
- Stable release: 21.5.1 / August 2026
- Operating system: Windows 7 SP1; Windows 10 version 1703 or later; macOS 10.12 or later
- Available in: 24 languages
- List of languages English, Arabic, Brazilian Portuguese, Chinese Simplified, Chinese Traditional, Czech, Danish, Dutch, Finnish, French, German, Greek, Hebrew, Hungarian, Italian, Japanese, Korean, Polish, Romanian, Russian, Spanish, Swedish, Turkish, Ukrainian
- Type: Word processor
- License: Trialware, Proprietary, term
- Website: www.adobe.com/products/incopy/

Adobe InCopy is a professional word processor made by Adobe Inc. that integrates with Adobe InDesign. InCopy is used for general word processing, in contrast to InDesign, which is used to publish printed material, including newspapers and magazines. The software enables editors to write, edit, and design documents. The software includes standard word processing features such as spell check, track changes, and word count, and has various viewing modes that allow editors to visually inspect design elements — just as it looks to the designer working in Adobe InDesign.

Version 3.0 of InCopy was included in the first Adobe Creative Suite in 2003, and later versions were included in versions of the Creative Suite up until version CS6. Since 2013 newer versions have been made available only through Adobe Creative Cloud.

== Viewing modes ==
InCopy has three viewing modes: Story mode, galley mode and layout mode. The story mode is for reading and editing text in a screen-wide view without page formatting. The galley mode displays text without page formatting but with line numbers and the same line breaks seen in the layout mode. Both galley and story views show the names of the style sheets applied to the text but do not display the actual formatting. The layout mode shows the true page design layout along with images and overset text.

Although InCopy can be used as a word processor (with full printing and exporting functions), it is primarily used to integrate with Adobe InDesign. Once integrated, writers, editors and designers can simultaneously work on the same page; the designer creates the page layout with InDesign, while editors simultaneously edit different stories with InCopy, via the Adobe LiveEdit rights management system. Publishers often use a publishing system including workflow- and rights-management to the design and editing capabilities of the publishing system software.

== Internationalization and localization ==
A Middle Eastern edition of InCopy is specifically developed for Arabic and Hebrew languages. It features:

- Text settings: Special settings for laying out Arabic or Hebrew text, such as:
  1. Possibility to use Arabic, Persian or Hindi digits
  2. Use kashida for letter spacing and full justification
  3. Ligature option
  4. Adjust the position of diacritics (such as Arabic vowels)
  5. Justify text in three possible ways: Standard, Arabic, Naskh
  6. Option to insert special characters, including three Hebrew characters (geresh, gershayim, maqaf) and an Arabic one (Kashida)
  7. Apply standard, Arabic or Hebrew styles for page, paragraph and footnote numbering
- Bi-directional text flow: The notion of right-to-left behavior applies to several objects: Story, paragraph, character and table. Right-to-left and left-to-right content can be mixed.
- Dictionary and hyphenation module: Includes a dictionary for Hebrew or Arabic for spelling check, with a choice of rules, like strict alef hamza, strict final yāʾ, both or none.
- Enhanced font support: Supports most fonts shipped with the OS as well as a large number of third-party fonts.
- Search and replace: It is possible to search and change specific occurrences of Middle Eastern characters, words, groups of words, or text formatted a certain way across a selection, one or more stories, a document, or multiple open documents. Searching for OpenType attributes such as fractions and swashes is also supported.
- Importing and exporting: Can import QuarkXPress files, even using Arabic XT, Arabic Phonyx or Hebrew QXPressWay fonts, retaining the layout and content. Includes 50 import and export filters.

== History ==
Version	Release data	Note
1.0	October 1999	
2.0	2002	first release with Mac OS X support
CS (3.0)	Late 2003	
CS2 (4.0)	May 2005	
CS3 (5.0)	June 2007	
CS4 (6.0)	November 2008	
CS5 (7.0)	May 2010	
CS6 (8.0)	April 2012	
CC (9.0)	June 2013	
CC 2014 (10.0)	June 2014	
CC 2015 (11.0)		
CC 2017 (12.0)		
CC 2018 (13.0)	October 2017	
CC 2019 (14.0)		

== See also ==
- Quark CopyDesk - another professional word processing software product, first released in 1991
