= Doc (computing) =

Filename extension

Word Document
- Icon as used in Microsoft Word 9.0 and 2002
- Filename extension: doc
- Internet media type: application/msword
- Uniform Type Identifier (UTI): com.microsoft.word.doc
- Developed by: Microsoft
- Latest release: 12.0; 20 August 2024; 21 months ago
- Type of format: document file format
- Container for: Text, Image,Table
- Extended from: Compound File Binary Format (since 97)
- Extended to: Microsoft Office XML formats, Office Open XML
- Open format?: Yes

.doc (an abbreviation of "document") is a filename extension used for word processing documents stored on Microsoft's proprietary Microsoft Word Binary File Format; it was the primary format for Microsoft Word until the 2007 version replaced it with Office Open XML .docx files. Microsoft has used the extension since 1983.

== Overview ==
Binary DOC files often contain more text formatting information (as well as scripts and undo information) than some other document file formats like Rich Text Format and Hypertext Markup Language, but are usually less widely compatible.

The DOC files created with Microsoft Word versions differ: Word for Windows 1.0 and 2.0 uses a format that was changed in the following Word 6.0 and 95 ("7.0") releases. DOC was changed once again into an OLE and CFBF-based format used from Word 97 ("8.0") to 2003 ("11.0"). Word for MS-DOS used its own specific DOC format.

In order to allow users of Word 6.0 and Word 95 to be able to open and read documents created in the newer (97–2003) format, Microsoft released the downloadable Word 97 Import Converter.

In Microsoft Word 2007 and later, the binary file format was replaced as the default format by the Office Open XML (.docx) format, though Microsoft Word can still produce and open DOC files. Microsoft released the Office Compatibility Pack allowing users of Word 2003, 2002, 2000 and 97 to open the new format as well as edit and save them. Modern versions of Word can also open documents in the pre-97 DOC formats, but should be manually enabled in the File Block Settings.

== Application support ==
The DOC format is native to Microsoft Word. Other word processors, such as OpenOffice.org Writer, IBM Lotus Symphony, Apple Pages and AbiWord, can also create and read DOC files, although with some limitations. Command line programs for Unix-like operating systems that can convert files from the DOC format to plain text or other standard formats include the wv library, which itself is used directly by AbiWord.

== Specification ==
Because the DOC file format was a closed specification for many years, inconsistent handling of the format persists and may cause some loss of formatting information when handling the same file with multiple word processing programs. Some specifications for Microsoft Office 97 binary file formats were published in 1997 under a restrictive license, but these specifications were removed from online download in 1999. Specifications of later versions of Microsoft Office binary file formats were not publicly available. The DOC format specification was available from Microsoft on request since 2006 under restrictive RAND-Z terms until February 2008. Sun Microsystems and OpenOffice.org reverse engineered the file format. On February 15, 2008, Microsoft released a .DOC format specification under the Microsoft Open Specification Promise. However, this specification does not describe all of the features used by DOC format and reverse engineered work remains necessary. Since 2008 the specification has been updated several times; the latest change was made in May 2022.

The format used in earlier, pre-97 ("1.0" 1989 through "7.0" 1995) versions of Word are less known, but both OpenOffice and LibreOffice contain open-source code for reading these formats. The format is probably related to the "Stream" format found in similar Excel versions. Word 95 also seems to have an OLE-wrapped form.

== Other .doc file formats ==
Some historical documentations may use the DOC filename extension for plain-text files, indicating documentation for software or hardware. The DOC filename extension was also used during the 1980s by WordPerfect for its proprietary format.

DOC is sometimes used by users of Palm OS as shorthand for PalmDoc, an unrelated format (commonly using PDB filename extension) used to encode text files such as ebooks.

== See also ==
- docx, the file format used by modern versions of Word
- De facto standard
- Dominant design
