= OpenOffice.org XML =

Default file format for saving files

OpenOffice.org XML is an open XML-based file format developed as an open community effort by Sun Microsystems in 2000–2002. The open-source software application suite OpenOffice.org 1.x and StarOffice 6 and 7 used the format as their native and default file format for saving files. The OpenOffice.org XML format is no longer widely used, but it is still supported in recent versions of OpenOffice.org-descended software.

OpenDocument (ISO/IEC 26300:2006) is based on OpenOffice.org XML and these formats are very similar in many technical areas. However, OpenDocument is not the same as the older OpenOffice.org XML format and these formats are not directly compatible. In 2005, OpenOffice.org (since version 2.0) and StarOffice (since version 8) switched to OpenDocument as their native and default format.

== History ==
StarOffice developers adopted XML to replace the old binary StarOffice file format. The draft version was also known as StarOffice XML File Format.

The stated goal in the draft was:

Our goal is twofold: to have a complete specification encompassing all StarOffice components, and to provide an open standard for office documents.

== File formats ==
The format uses XML files to describe the documents. To minimize space, the files are compressed into an archive and given a suffix depending on what sort of data is contained in them.

File type	OpenOffice.org/StarOffice component	File (template) suffixes	MIME
Text	Writer	sxw (stw)	application/vnd.sun.xml.writer application/vnd.sun.xml.writer.template
Spreadsheet	Calc	sxc (stc)	application/vnd.sun.xml.calc application/vnd.sun.xml.calc.template
Graphics	Draw	sxd (std)	application/vnd.sun.xml.draw application/vnd.sun.xml.draw.template
Presentation	Impress	sxi (sti)	application/vnd.sun.xml.impress application/vnd.sun.xml.impress.template
Formula	Math	sxm	application/vnd.sun.xml.math
Master document	Writer	sxg	application/vnd.sun.xml.writer.global
HTML	Writer	HTML (stw)	text/html application/vnd.sun.xml.writer.web

== Implementations ==
- Abiword (SXW)
- Apache OpenOffice
- EditGrid Viewer (SXC)
- Gnumeric (SXC)
- Google Docs (SXW, import only)
- KOffice (SXW, SXC, SXI)
- LibreOffice (as of 4.3, import only)
- OpenOffice.org
- StarOffice/Oracle Open Office
- SoftMaker Office 2006
  - TextMaker 2006 (SXW, import only)
  - TextMaker Viewer (SXW, view only)
- Visioo-Writer (limited support)
- Zoho Office (SXW, SXC, SXI - view/edit/convert files)
  - Zoho Viewer (SXW, SXC, SXI - view/convert files)
  - Zoho QuickRead - a Firefox/Internet Explorer plug-in for online Viewer

== See also ==
- List of document markup languages
- Comparison of document markup languages
