= JWPce =

Japanese-language text editor

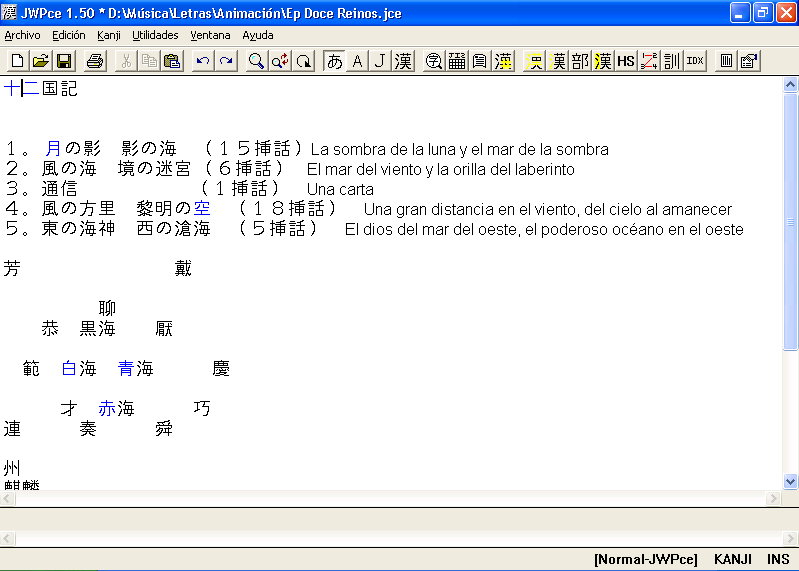
- JWPce 1.50 Screenshot
- Stable release: 1.50 / February 10, 2005; 20 years ago
- Written in: C++
- Operating system: Microsoft Windows; Wine officially supported
- Available in: English + others
- Type: Word processor
- License: GPL
- Website: www.physics.ucla.edu/~grosenth/jwpce.html

JWPce is a simple Japanese-language text editor that runs on the Windows 95, ME, 2000, XP, NT, and CE platforms. It is designed for non-native speakers of Japanese who want to produce Japanese-language documents. Distributed under the terms of the GNU General Public License, JWPce is free software.

== Features ==
The default installation has English-language menus. Language packs for other languages are available and JWPce is designed to make adding further language packs straightforward.

JWPce offers many facilities that are useful to students of Japanese such as detailed kanji information (using KANJIDIC), a built-in Japanese dictionary (using EDICT and similar dictionary files) and various kanji lookup methods. It allows users to translate both to and from Japanese, using either kanji or kana. JWPce can look up kanji by stroke number and by identifying any number of radicals contained within the kanji. Therefore, if you can recognize two or more radicals within the kanji, you can search for all kanji containing all of these radicals. It also contains nine kanji lookup systems.

JWPce supports multiple file encodings and also supports Unicode both in files and on the clipboard. It does not provide facilities for vertical text, nor does it provide facilities to specify different fonts within a document. However, JWPce does allow the user to customize the fonts used to display text in the various parts of the editor. JWPce can also display kanji in a list you generate in a different color so that it colors either the kanji that the user does not know or that the user does know.

When importing from the clipboard, JWPce can detect the clipboard format automatically. That makes reading Japanese web pages much easier. JWPce also has the ability to provide a large amount of information on any kanji character, including meanings, on-yomi, kun-yomi, etc.

A key feature of JWPce is that it runs smoothly on Windows CE and Pocket PC platforms. This allows learners of Japanese to use a PDA as an electronic Japanese dictionary. The version for MS Windows on standard PCs also runs well under Wine in Unix-like environments. In case of problems with the compiled jwpce.exe, a special download for Wine is also available.
