= Gobe Software =

Gobe Software Inc.
- Type: Private
- Industry: Software
- Founded: 1997; 29 years ago
- Founders: Scott Holdaway; Tom Hoke; Scott Lindsey; Bruce Hammond; Carl Grice
- Defunct: 2002
- Fate: Dissolved
- Headquarters: Portland, Oregon, United States
- Products: Gobe Productive

Gobe Software, Inc was a software company founded in 1997 by members of the ClarisWorks development team that developed and published an integrated desktop software suite for BeOS. In later years, it was the distributor of BeOS itself.

== History ==
Gobe was founded in 1997 by members of the ClarisWorks development team and some of the authors of the original Styleware application for the Apple II. After leaving StyleWare and creating the product later known as ClarisWorks and AppleWorks, Bob Hearn, Scott Holdaway joined Tom Hoke, Scott Lindsey, Bruce Q. Hammond, and Carl Grice who also worked at Apple Computer's Claris subsidiary and formed Gobe Software, Inc with the notion to create a next-generation integrated office suite similar to ClarisWorks, but for the BeOS platform. It released Gobe Productive in 1998.

When Be Inc. outsourced publication of BeOS in 2000, Gobe became the publisher of BeOS in North America, Australia, and sections of Asia. Only weeks after signing up other publishers around the globe, Be, Inc. halted development for the BeOS platform and publicly announced that all of its corporate focus would be on "Internet Appliances" and made public announcements that hampered forward momentum of the BeOS platform. In addition, the publishers in general and Gobe in particular did not have source code access to the BeOS and were not able to continue its development or add drivers that the platform needed to be a viable alternative to Windows or Linux. Gobe also published Hicom Entertainment/Next Generation Entertainments "Corum III" role-playing game for BeOS during this period.

The failure of Be, Inc and BeOS meant ports had to be undertaken, and Windows and Linux variants were developed. Although the company shipped a Windows version of its software in December 2001, it was unable to obtain sufficient operating capital after the 2000 stock market crash and suspended operations 2002. In 2008 Gobe management began to work with distribution and development teams in Greater Asia and had plans to ship a new version of the product for the India market early 2010. Later in August 2010, Gobe Productive's website was disabled and then sold to an Indian movie producer called ErosNow.

== Gobe Productive ==
Gobe Productive
- Developer: Gobe Software
- Release: August 1998; 28 years ago

Final release(s)
- BeOS: 2.0.1 / 2000-02-29
- Windows: 3.0.4 / 2003-07-08

Preview release(s)
- Linux: pre-alpha 1 (Note: pre-alpha 1 preview release) / 2002-05-24
- Written in: C++
- Operating system: BeOS, Microsoft Windows and Linux
- Type: Office suite
- License: Proprietary

The main product, Gobe Productive, was by far the most polished of the word processors, spreadsheet and vector graphics applications for BeOS, but as an integrated package in the manner of ClarisWorks and Microsoft Works.

Gobe Productive v1.0 for BeOS was released in August 1998, v2.0 in August 1999, and v2.0.1 on 29 February 2000.

After the failure of Be, Inc, Windows and Linux variants were developed. The company shipped a Windows version of Gobe Productive 3 in December 2001.

== Other Gobe employees ==
- Dave Johnson
- Ben Chang
- Joël Spaltenstein
- Kurt von Finck
- Daniel Maia Alves
- Cheyenne Tuller
- Tomy Hudson

== See also ==
- Comparison of office suites
