= AbiWord =

Free software word processor

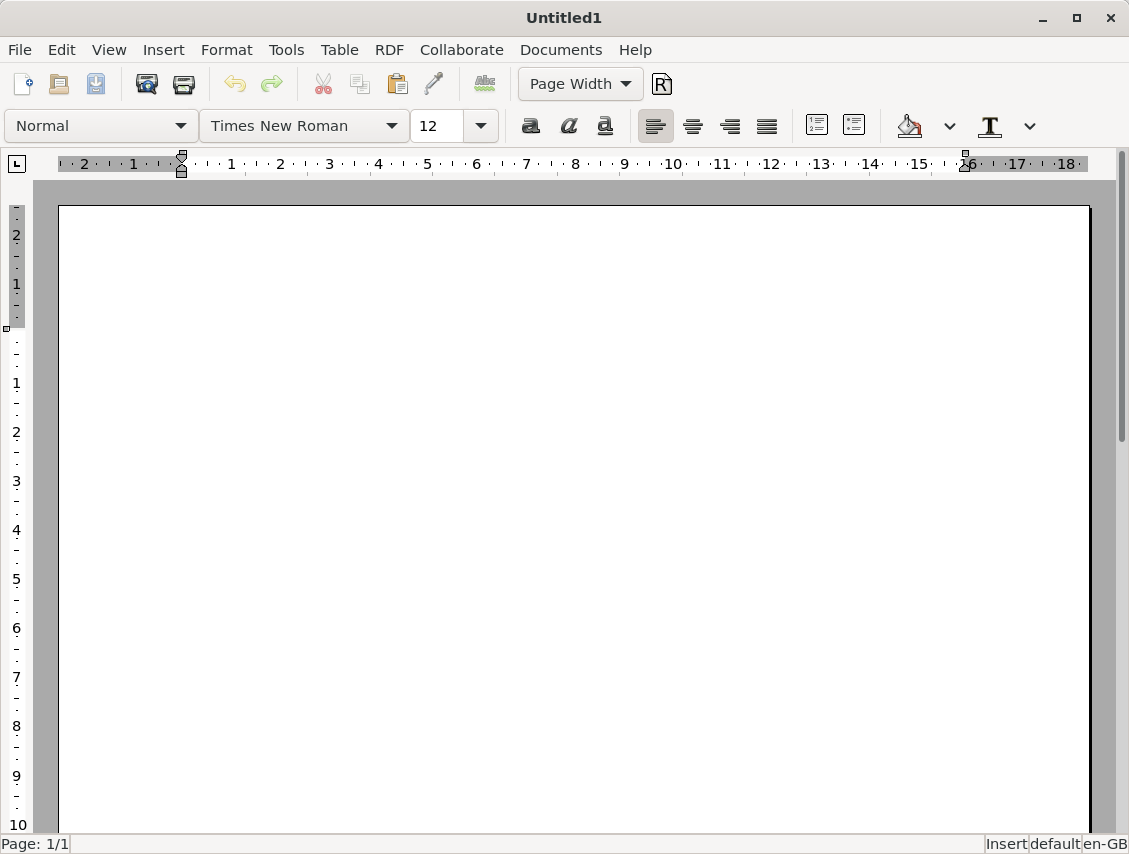
- AbiWord running on Debian 11
- Developer: AbiSource
- Release: April 19, 2002; 24 years ago
- Stable release: 3.0.8 / 18 February 2026
- Preview release: none (Linux), 2.9.4 (Windows) [±]
- Written in: C++
- Operating system: Cross-platform
- Available in: Multilingual
- Type: Word processor
- License: GPL-2.0-or-later
- Website: www.abisource.com at the Wayback Machine (archived 26 October 2025)
- Repository: gitlab.gnome.org/World/AbiWord

AbiWord (/ˈæbiwɜːrd/) is a free and open-source word processor. It is written in C++ and since version 3 it is based on GTK+ 3. The name "AbiWord" is derived from the root of the Spanish word "abierto", meaning "open".

AbiWord was originally started by SourceGear Corporation as the first part of a proposed AbiSuite but was adopted by open source developers after SourceGear changed its business focus and ceased development. It now runs on Linux, ReactOS, Solaris, AmigaOS 4.0 (through its Cygwin X11 engine), MeeGo (on the Nokia N9 smartphone), Maemo (on the Nokia N810), QNX and other operating systems. Development of a version for Microsoft Windows ended due to lack of maintainers (the latest released versions are 2.8.6 and 2.9.4 beta).

The macOS port has remained on version 2.4 since 2005, although the current version does run non-natively on macOS through XQuartz.

AbiWord is part of the AbiSource project which develops a number of office-related technologies.

== Features ==
AbiWord supports both basic word processing features such as lists, indents and character formats, and more sophisticated features including tables, styles, page headers and footers, footnotes, templates, multiple views, page columns, spell checking, and grammar checking. The Presentation view of AbiWord, which permits easy display of presentations created in AbiWord on "screen-sized" pages, is another feature not often found in word processors.

=== Interface ===
AbiWord generally works similarly to classic versions (pre-Office 2007) of Microsoft Word, as direct ease of migration was a high priority early goal. While many interface similarities remain, cloning the Word interface is no longer a top priority. The interface is intended to follow user interface guidelines for each respective platform.

=== Collaboration ===
AbiWord allows users to share and collaborate on documents in a similar manner to Google Docs, using a system known as GOCollab. Users can collaborate using a varitety of different protocols including TCP and XMPP, and formerly over AbiCollab.net, a web based service that facilitated collaboration between users.

=== File formats ===
AbiWord comes with several import and export filters providing partial support for such formats as HTML, Microsoft Word (.doc), Office Open XML (.docx), OpenDocument Text (.odt), Rich Text Format (.rtf), and text documents (.txt). LaTeX is supported for export only. Plug-in filters are available to deal with many other formats, notably WordPerfect documents. The native file format, .abw, uses XML, so as to mitigate vendor lock-in concerns with respect to interoperability and digital archiving.

=== Grammar checking ===
The AbiWord project includes a US English-only grammar checking plugin using Link Grammar. AbiWord had grammar checking before any other open source word processor. Link Grammar is both a theory of syntax and an open source parser which is now developed by the AbiWord project.

== Version history ==
Version 0.1.0 made public, source only – August 21st, 1998, demoed at Open Source Developer Day.

Version 0.7.0 – May 19th, 1999 – first binary release.

Version 1.0 – April 19th, 2002.

== See also ==
- List of free and open-source software packages
- List of word processors
- Comparison of word processors
- Office Open XML software
- OpenDocument software
