= Uniform Office Format =

Open standard for office applications

- Filename extension: .uof, .uot, .uos, .uop
- Initial release: April 30, 2007; 18 years ago
- Latest release: 2.0; 2011; 14 years ago
- Type of format: Document file format
- Extended from: XML, SVG
- Standard: GB/T20916-2007
- Open format?: Yes

Uniform Office Format (UOF; Chinese: 标文通, lit. "standard text general"), sometimes known as Unified Office Format, is an open standard for office applications developed in China. It includes word processing, presentation, and spreadsheet modules, and is made up of GUI, API, and format specifications. The document format described uses XML contained in a compressed file container, similar to OpenDocument and Office Open XML.

The working group that produced the standard was founded in January 2002, and the first draft of the specification was produced in December 2005.

== Application support ==
=== Office suites ===
A number of applications list support for the Uniform Office Format; listed alphabetically they include:

- EIOffice 2009 is said to be based on UOF. It uses binder files with file extension EIO (.eio). In the latest version 5.0.1272.101 it doesn't open or save files with extensions .uof, .uot, .uos or .uop. The documentation of EIOffice states it is possible to publish documents in "Unit Office Format (XML)"
- OpenOffice.org and LibreOffice from version 3 can open and save files in "Unified Office Format" with file extensions .uof, .uot, .uos, .uop (text, spreadsheet, presentation) (This also applies to version 3 of NeoOffice, a popular variant of OpenOffice for the Macintosh.).
- RedOffice 4.0, a Chinese OpenOffice.org variant, can open and save files with file extension .uof.
- WPS Office claims read and write support of UOF since 2009, including UOF 2.0.

=== Filters and converters ===
==== ODF to UOF ====
Software is available to convert from ODF to UOF and the other way round. The software was developed between November 2005 and October 2006 by the Open Standard Lab of Peking University.

==== OOXML to UOF ====
Software is being developed at ACT (The Institute of Advanced Computing Technology) at Beihang University to convert from OOXML to UOF and vice versa.

== Possibility of merging UOF and ODF ==
At the "World Trade Organization IPRs Issues in Standardization" conference in Beijing (April 2007), convened by the Chinese Ministry of Commerce, the China State Intellectual Property Office (SIPO) and Sun Microsystems, Scott McNealy, the Chairman of Sun Microsystems called for a merger of OASIS/ISO's ODF and China's UOF. While both formats are open, there are significant technical challenges in achieving a merger, as the two formats have made different fundamental choices in how to describe documents.

A comparison document between ODF and UOF is available from the ODF-UOF project on SourceForge.

== UOF 2.0 ==
UOF 2.0 was released in 2011, with support from WPS Office.
