= Word processor =

Device or computer program used for writing and editing documents

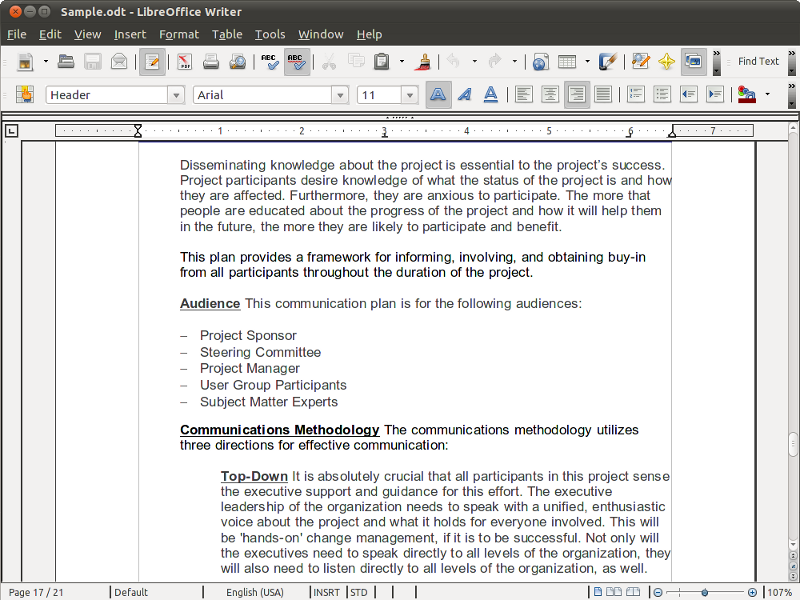
A document being edited in LibreOffice Writer, a modern word processing program running on Linux

A word processor (WP) is a device or computer program that provides for input, editing, formatting, and output of text, often with some additional features.

Early word processors were stand-alone devices dedicated to the function, but current word processors are primarily word processor programs running on general purpose computers, including smartphones, tablets, laptops, and desktop computers, with dedicated hardware word processors being confined to a small niche market.

The functions of a word processor program are typically between those of a simple text editor and a desktop publishing program. Many word processing programs have gained advanced features over time providing similar functionality to desktop publishing programs.

== Background ==
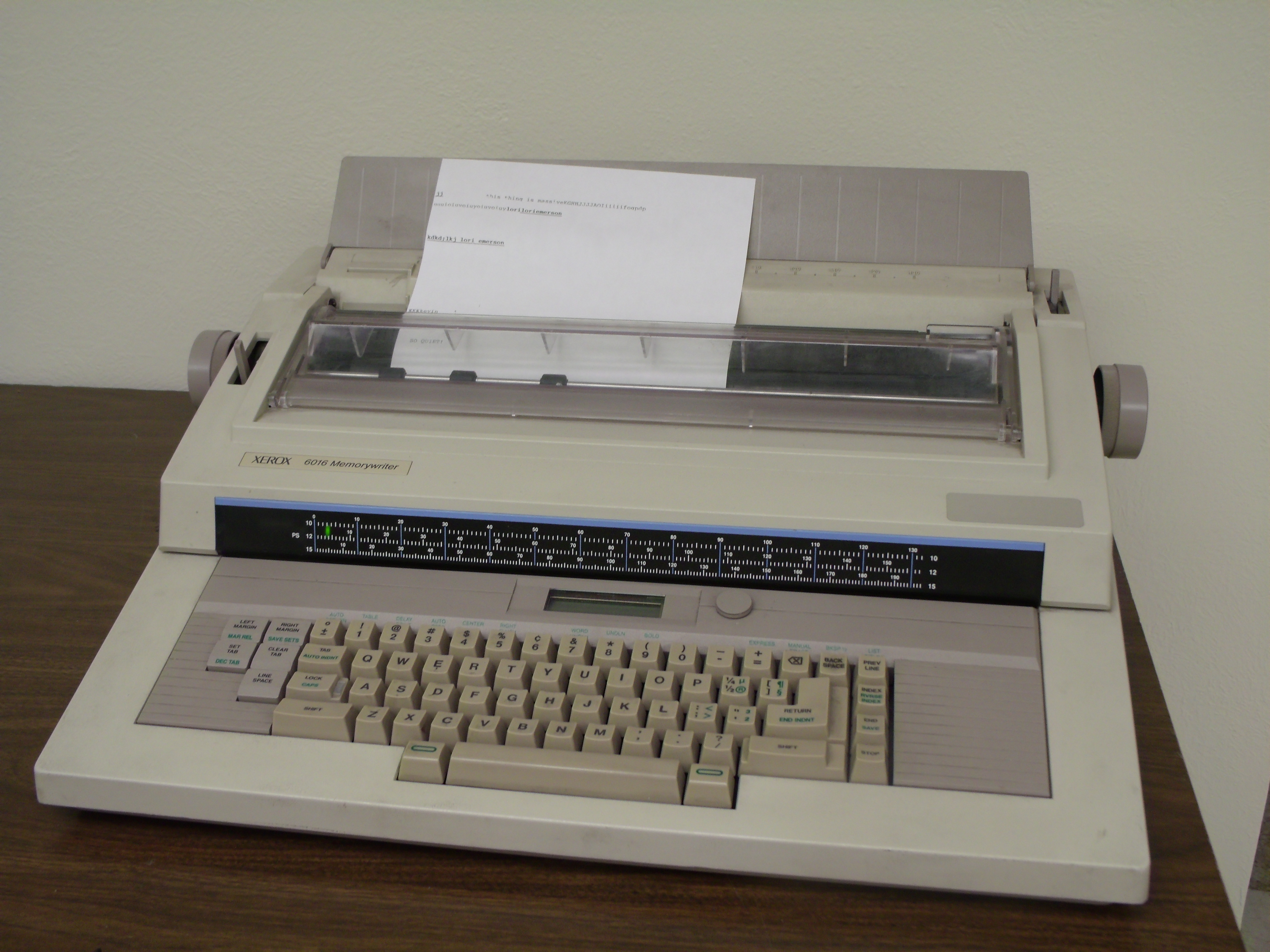
An early electronic word processor machine, the Xerox 6016

Word processors developed from mechanical machines, later merging with computer technology. The history of word processing is the story of the gradual automation of the physical aspects of writing and editing, and then to the refinement of the technology to make it available to corporations and Individuals.

The term word processing appeared in American offices in the early 1970s, centered on the idea of streamlining the work of typists, but the meaning soon shifted toward the automation of the whole editing cycle.

At first, the designers of word processing systems combined existing technologies with emerging ones to develop stand-alone equipment, creating a new business distinct from the emerging world of the personal computer. The concept of word processing arose from the more general data processing, which since the 1950s had been the application of computers to business administration.

Through history, there have been three types of word processors: mechanical, electronic, and software.

== Mechanical word processing ==
The first word processing device (a "Machine for Transcribing Letters" that appears to have been similar to a typewriter) was patented in 1714 by Henry Mill for a machine that was capable of "writing so clearly and accurately you could not distinguish it from a printing press". More than a century later, another patent appeared in the name of William Austin Burt for the typographer. In the late 19th century, Christopher Latham Sholes created the first recognizable typewriter, which was described as a "literary piano".

The only "word processing" these mechanical systems could perform was to change where letters appeared on the page, to fill in spaces that were previously left on the page, or to skip over lines. It was not until decades later that the introduction of electricity and electronics into typewriters began to help the writer with the mechanical part. The term "word processing" (translated from the German word Textverarbeitung) itself was possibly created in the 1950s by Ulrich Steinhilper, a German IBM typewriter sales executive, or by an American electro-mechanical typewriter executive, George M. Ryan, who obtained a trademark registration in the USPTO for the phrase. However, it did not make its appearance in 1960s office management or computing literature (an example of grey literature), though many of the ideas, products, and technologies to which it would later be applied were already well known. Nonetheless, by 1971, the term was recognized by the New York Times as a business "buzz word". Word processing paralleled the more general "data processing", or the application of computers to business administration.

Thus, by 1972, the discussion of word processing was common in publications devoted to business office management and technology; by the mid-1970s, the term would have been familiar to any office manager who consulted business periodicals.

== Electromechanical and electronic word processing ==
By the late 1960s, IBM had developed the IBM MT/ST (Magnetic Tape/Selectric Typewriter). It was a model of the IBM Selectric typewriter from earlier in 1961, but it came built into its own desk, integrated with magnetic tape recording and playback facilities along with controls and a bank of electrical relays. The MT/ST had automated word wrap, but it had no screen. This device allowed a user to rewrite text that had been written on another tape, and it also allowed limited collaboration in the sense that a user could send the tape to another person to let them edit the document or make a copy. It was a revolution for the word processing industry. In 1969, the tapes were replaced by magnetic cards. These memory cards were inserted into an extra device that accompanied the MT/ST, able to read and record users' work.

Throughout the 1960s and 70s, word processing began to slowly shift from glorified typewriters augmented with electronic features to become fully computer-based (although only with single-purpose hardware) with the development of several innovations. Just before the arrival of the personal computer (PC), IBM developed the floppy disk. In the 1970s, the first proper word-processing systems appeared, which allowed display and editing of documents on CRT screens.

During this era, these early stand-alone word processing systems were designed, built, and marketed by several pioneering companies. Linolex Systems was founded in 1970 by James Lincoln and Robert Oleksiak. Linolex based its technology on microprocessors, floppy drives, and software. It was a computer-based system for application in the word processing businesses, and it sold systems through its own sales force. With a base of installed systems in over 500 sites, Linolex Systems sold 3 million units in 1975 — a year before the Apple computer was released.

At that time, the Lexitron Corporation also produced a series of dedicated word-processing microcomputers. Lexitron was the first to use a full-sized video display screen (CRT) in its models by 1978. Lexitron also used 5 1/4 inch floppy diskettes, which became the standard in the personal computer field. The program disk was inserted in one drive, and the system booted up. The data diskette was then put in the second drive. The operating system and the word processing program were combined in one file.

Another of the early word processing adopters was Vydec, which created in 1973 the first modern text processor, the "Vydec Word Processing System". It had built-in multiple functions like the ability to share content on a diskette and print it. The Vydec Word Processing System sold for $12,000 at the time, (about $60,000 adjusted for inflation).

The Redactron Corporation (organized by Evelyn Berezin in 1969) designed and manufactured editing systems, including correcting/editing typewriters, cassette and card units, and eventually a word processor called the Data Secretary. The Burroughs Corporation acquired Redactron in 1976.

A CRT-based system by Wang Laboratories became one of the most popular systems of the 1970s and early 1980s. The Wang system displayed text on a CRT screen, and incorporated virtually every fundamental characteristic of word processors as they are known today. While early computerized word processor systems were often expensive and hard to use (that is, like the computer mainframes of the 1960s), the Wang system was a true office machine, affordable to organizations such as medium-sized law firms, and easily mastered and operated by secretarial staff.

The phrase "word processor" rapidly came to refer to CRT-based machines similar to Wang's. Numerous machines of this kind emerged, typically marketed by traditional office-equipment companies such as IBM, Lanier (AES Data machines - re-badged), CPT, and NBI. All were specialized, dedicated, proprietary systems, with prices in the $10,000 range. Cheap general-purpose personal computers were still the domain of hobbyists.

== Japanese word processor devices ==
In Japan, even though typewriters with the Japanese writing system had been used for businesses and governments, they were limited to specialists and required special skills due to the wide variety of symbols, until computer-based devices came onto the market. Japanese typewriters required the operator to search for and retrieve each character individually from a layout of over 1,000 type slugs. The operation was complicated and demanded considerable skill. For this reason, mimeographing was widely used for small-scale printing instead of typewriters before the invention of word processors.

In countries using the Latin alphabet, word processors were relatively easy to develop since text processing required only alphanumeric characters and a few symbols. However, because typewriters were already sufficient for practical needs in Latin-alphabet countries, the demand for expensive dedicated word processors was limited. As a result, many users transitioned directly from typewriters to word processing software on personal computers (PCs) within a short span, and dedicated word processors did not achieve widespread adoption.

In contrast, Japan faced challenges such as printing more complex characters than the alphabet and devising methods for kanji input, which made development difficult. However, once Japanese word processors appeared, they were quickly embraced. As a result, in 20th-century Japan, the transition often proceeded directly from handwriting and mimeographing to dedicated word processors, and then to word processing software on personal computers—without going through the stage of typewriter use.

=== Birth ===
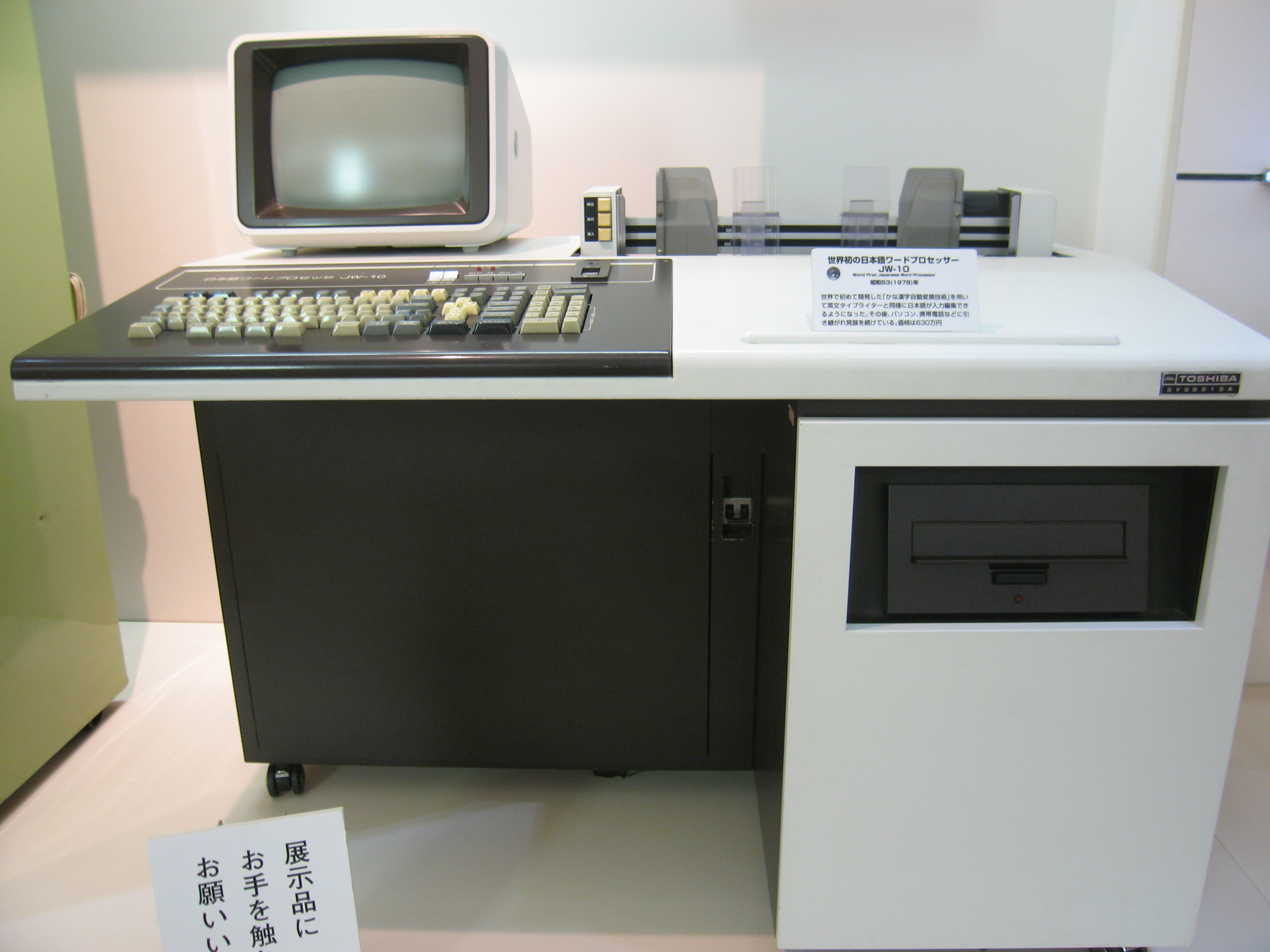
World-first Japanese word processor Toshiba JW-10 (launched in February 1979, Toshiba Science Institute)

In May 1977, Sharp showcased a prototype of a computer-based word processing dedicated device with the Japanese writing system at the Business Show in Tokyo. The later commercial model (WD-3000), however, did not yet include kana-to-kanji conversion.

Toshiba released the first Japanese word processor JW-10 in February 1979. The price was 6,300,000 JPY, equivalent to US$45,000. This is selected as one of the milestones of IEEE.

The Japanese writing system uses a large number of kanji (logographic Chinese characters), which require 2 bytes to store, so having one key per each symbol is infeasible. Japanese word processing became possible with the development of the Japanese input method (a sequence of keypresses, with visual feedback, which selects a character)—now widely used in personal computers.

In September 1979, Sharp released its first commercial product WD-3000, which used the industry's first pen tablet system, instead of keyboard input and kana-to-kanji conversion. It was equipped with an inkjet printer and priced at 2,950,000 JPY. Sharp adopted pen computing to side-step the problem of "keyboard phobia" because there were almost no people involved in clerical work who could handle a keyboard at the time. The company subsequently released the "Sharp Shoin" series of word processors, named after shoin (書院, drawing room or study), a type of audience hall in Japanese architecture.

=== Spread ===
Oki Electric Industry launched Oki Word Editor-200 in March 1979 with this kana-based keyboard input system. In 1980 several electronics and office equipment brands entered this rapidly growing market with more compact and affordable devices. For instance, NEC introduced the NWP-20, and Fujitsu launched the Fujitsu OASYS. While the average unit price in 1980 was 2,000,000 JPY (US$14,300), it dropped to 164,000 JPY (US$1,200) in 1985. Even after personal computers became widely available, Japanese word processors remained popular as they tended to be more portable (an "office computer" was initially too large to carry around), and become commonplace for business and academics, even for private individuals in the second half of the 1980s. In Japanese, the word wāpuro (ワープロ), an abbreviation from wādo purosessā (ワードプロセッサー; "word processor") gained common currency in 1982 with Fujitsu's commercial for its "My OASYS" word processor.

=== Personal wāpuro boom ===
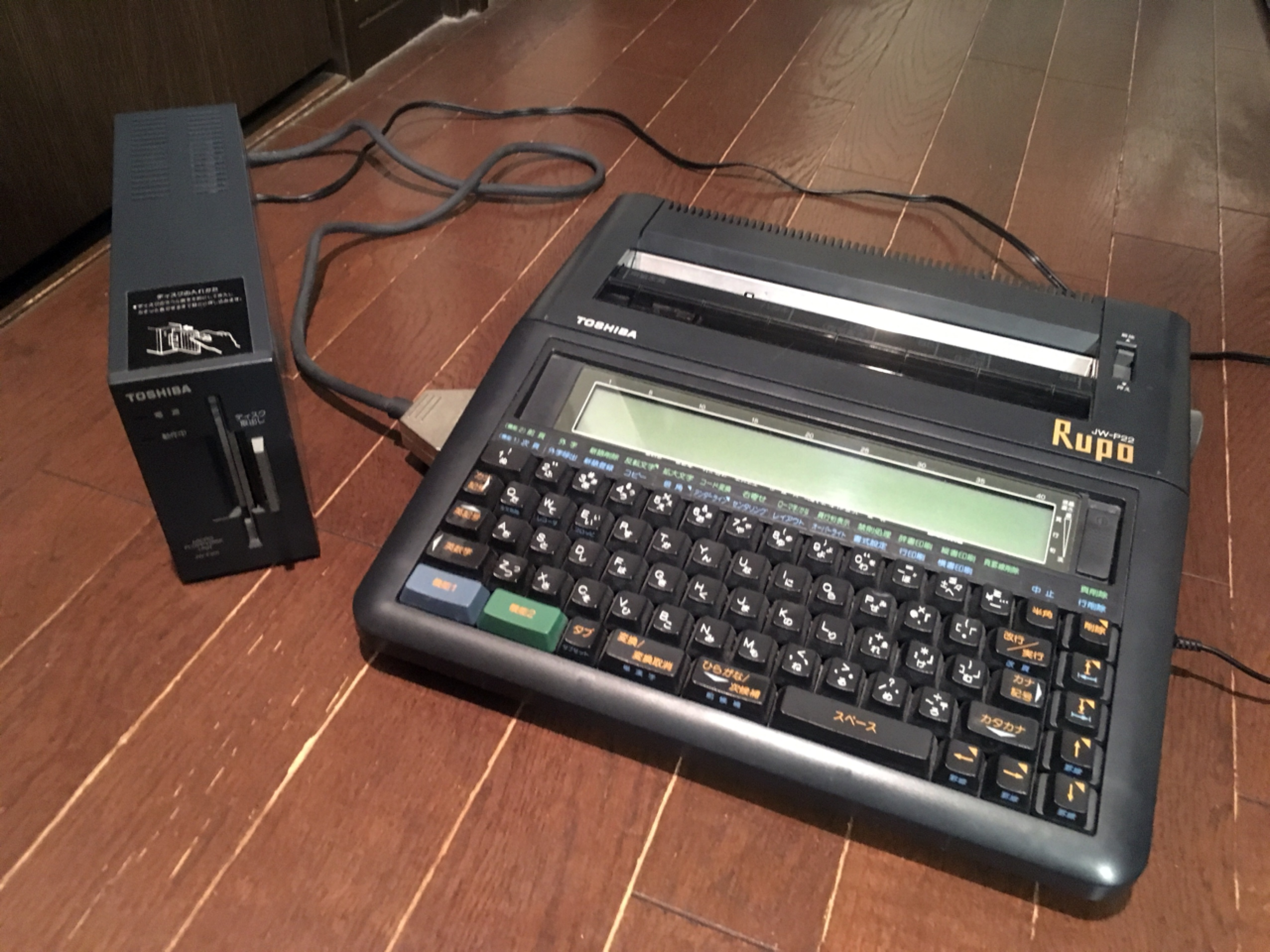
Toshiba Rupo JW-P22(K) (March 1986) and an optional micro floppy disk drive unit JW-F201

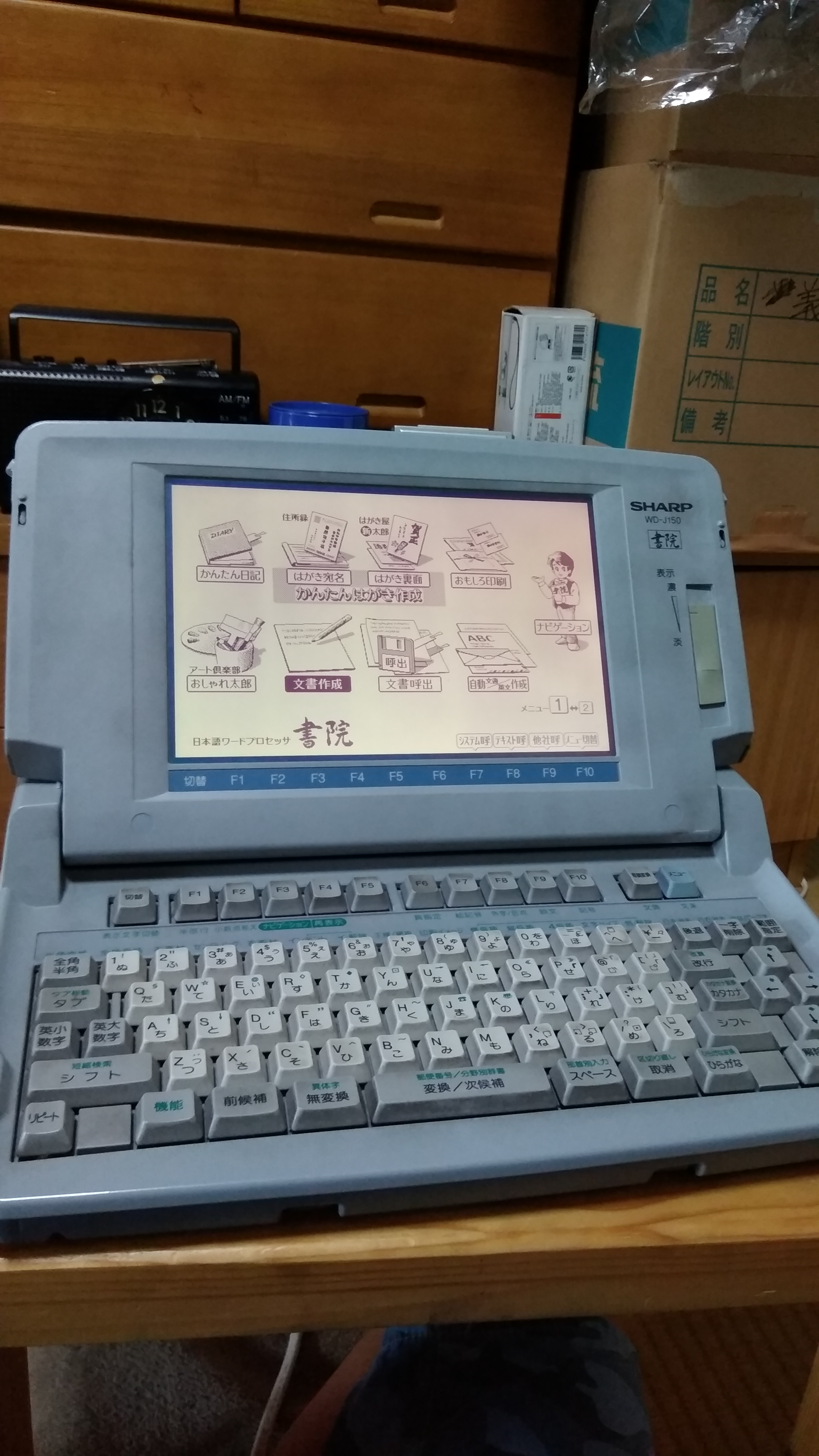
Sharp Shoin WD-J150

At a business show in 1985, Casio caused a sensation by unveiling the Casio Word HW-100 at the price of 59,800 yen. In response, Canon followed with the PW-10E at 49,800 yen. This rapid price decline drew media comparisons to the earlier "calculator wars". Companies such as Sony and Seiko Epson also entered the market, triggering a personal word processor boom.

By the late 1980s, dedicated word processors had been miniaturized to a portable size. As personal word processors, they began to be introduced to small and medium-sized enterprises and individual users.

During this period, personal word processors for individual consumers were dedicated machines equipped with a keyboard-integrated printer and a small LCD panel showing only a few lines. Their functions were limited to text creation, proofreading, editing, and printing. As machine performance improved, however, the number of display lines on the LCD panel increased, making it easier to grasp the overall layout of a document. Advances in printing technology also meant that fonts were no longer restricted to Minchō; Gothic, brush-style, and other fonts became available, enabling high-resolution printing comparable to phototypesetting. Furthermore, many models began incorporating additional functions such as graphic drawing, pictograms, postcard printing (both front and back), card-type databases, address books, spreadsheets, and even personal computer communications. In terms of text processing, they became as advanced as—or even more advanced than—personal computers of the time.

Although personal computers were beginning to spread at the time, dedicated word processors retained certain advantages over personal computers (running word-processing software) in Japan, and for a while they remained commercially viable.

- Dedicated word processors were so-called "all-in-one" products. In particular, with regard to output (printing), it was technically challenging and costly at the time for PC printers to handle kanji, whereas word processors came equipped with built-in printers optimized for the machine's output specifications.
- On a personal computer, one had to boot up the system and then launch word-processing software, but most dedicated word processors allowed users to start writing immediately after turning on the power.
- In addition to JIS keyboard layouts, some models offered gojūon layouts (based on the standard gojūon syllable order of Japanese), making it easier for beginners to find keys. Fujitsu's models also included Thumb-shift (親指シフト, Oyayubi Shifuto) layouts designed for advanced users.
- Many features that are now standard in PC word-processing software—such as kana-to-kanji conversion, user dictionary registration, custom character creation, adjustable font sizes, multiple font choices, and scalable outline fonts (rather than bitmap fonts)—were originally developed and refined on dedicated word processors.

In the 1980s, separate from the trend of consumer-oriented products, workstations equipped with kanji-processing capabilities began to appear for business use. These machines incorporated not only the functions of personal word processors but also a variety of typesetting features. Many of them were utilized within companies as phototypesetting systems for document production, thereby taking a different path from that of personal word processors.

Meanwhile, personal computers began to be equipped with kanji ROMs, allowing kanji to be used even in BASIC, which at the time also served as the operating system. Affordable word-processing software and printers subsequently emerged. Later, PC/AT-compatible machines—the mainstream personal computers—became capable of handling kanji processing without kanji ROMs, which in turn accelerated the spread of personal computers. In 1988, the Japanese electronics magazine Dime sent inquiries to Japanese manufacturers (NEC, Canon, Sharp, Toshiba, Fujitsu, and Matsushita Electric), "Will word processors disappear in the future?", regarding the relationship between dedicated word processors and personal computers. All companies responded that the two would "coexist" or "continue to exist". NEC, which also produced personal computers, added that even if one were to disappear, due to hardware commonalities the situation would merely amount to a change in name.

=== End of production ===
Entering the 1990s, some models advanced from monochrome to color LCDs, but dedicated word processors gradually lost market share due to the declining prices of personal computers and word-processing software, as well as the appearance of inexpensive, high-performance PC printers. Dedicated word processors' poor capability to access the increasingly popular Internet further weakened demand. Shipments peaked in terms of unit volume in 1989 and in terms of sales value in 1991, then steadily declined. Household penetration of dedicated word processors also peaked in 1998, only to fall sharply thereafter. Finally, in 1999, PC sales surpassed those of dedicated word processors.

In February 2000, Sharp announced the Shoin series model WD-CP2, which turned out to be the last new release of a dedicated word processor in Japan. In September 2003, production of that model, along with the WD-VP and WD-MF01, was discontinued, marking the end of dedicated word processor manufacturing by all companies. Within businesses as well, document creation came to be replaced by general-purpose business software and commercially available printers, and the Japanese dedicated word processor disappeared from the scene.

=== Issues following discontinuation ===
For many companies, the question of how to transfer the vast archive of documents created on dedicated word processors to personal computers became a major challenge. Dedicated machines had handled elements such as ruled lines and ruby character (furigana) using proprietary methods developed by each manufacturer. Although some PC software included conversion features, ruled lines, unique pictograms, and symbols from different brands could not be converted. Even within a single manufacturer, methods of processing had changed as functions diversified, so in most cases, the best that could be done was converting the body text itself. As a result, with the demise of word processors, manufacturers were urged to develop software that would improve reproducibility on personal computers and facilitate data migration. While these tools did not guarantee perfect restoration, they were able to reproduce content to a reasonable degree and served their purpose.

Dedicated word processors retained a loyal following, and at one point prices in the secondhand market even rose. Well into the 21st century, they continued to be traded daily at online auctions regardless of condition.

Reasons for the continued support of dedicated word processors include: a strong sense of attachment among generations born up through the mid-1960s who had grown accustomed to them; their high stability and comfort as work environments for writers such as novelists and translators, with long continuous operation free from crashes; the high quality of their keyboards; their usefulness in workplaces concerned about information leaks via networks; and their appeal to collectors of Shōwa era and Bubble-era consumer electronics.

Furthermore, dedicated word processors had all the necessary functions built directly into the hardware, so they could be used immediately simply by turning on the power. Unlike personal computers, there was little need for complex operations or applying patches (fixes). Conversely, this also meant that they generally could not be updated to handle the latest requirements—for example, most models could not be adapted to support the seven-digit postal code system.

In reality, maintaining these machines has become increasingly difficult year by year due to a variety of factors: the discontinuation of ink ribbon and printing paper production; LCD panel burn-in caused by poor storage environments exposed to high heat and humidity (sometimes called "vinegar syndrome"); damage to or loss of system disks (caused by deterioration, mold, or copyright restrictions that prevented repair); leakage from batteries left inside units leading to corrosion of the main circuit board; the shutdown of some repair shops due to litigation risks from manufacturers; the end of replacement part supplies for belt-driven floppy disk drives; the declining availability of floppy disk media; damage to paper-feed knobs; deterioration of printer rollers; and rising repair costs.

After the end of official manufacturing and repair support, independent specialists continued repairs by salvaging usable components from existing units and replacing defective parts with them—a practice commonly referred to as "two-for-one" repairs.

=== Later developments ===
Even after the turn of the 21st century, certain aspects of the dedicated word processor concept continued to live on: the ability to instantly print a document on-site with a thermal printer, to hand over or revise text anywhere without depending on location, and to use the machine conveniently as a label printer. Drawing on smartphone and tablet technologies, products inspired by dedicated word processors began to appear in the late 2000s—such as LCD- and keyboard-equipped photo printers specialized for New Year's card printing (e.g., Casio Prinsharu and Epson Nengajō Atena Tatsujin), label printing (e.g., King Jim Tepra), and devices like the King Jim Pomera dedicated to plain text input.

== Word processing software ==
The final step in word processing came with the advent of the personal computer in the late 1970s and 1980s and with the subsequent creation of word processing software. Word processing software that would create much more complex and capable output was developed and prices began to fall, making them more accessible to the public. By the late 1970s, computerized word processors were still primarily used by employees composing documents for large and midsized businesses (e.g., law firms and newspapers). Within a few years, the falling prices of PCs made word processing available for the first time to all writers in the convenience of their homes. The functions of a word processor program are typically between those of a simple text editor and a desktop publishing program; many word processing programs have gained advanced features over time providing similar functionality to desktop publishing programs.

The first known electronic word processor program was Electric Pencil, released in 1976, as a tool for programmers to write documentation and manuals for their code. Electric pencil featured basic formatting and navigation, and supported external devices such as cassette recorders and printers. Electric Pencil II was released shortly after, targeting the CP/M operating system. Several other word processing programs were released shortly after, including EasyWriter and WordStar.

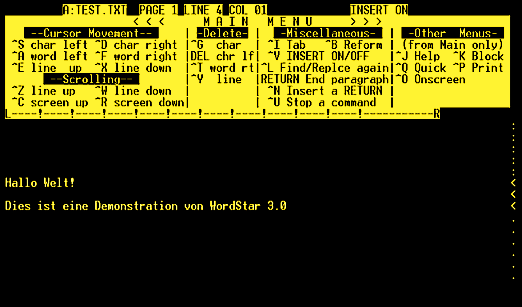
A screenshot of WordStar 3.0 in use

WordStar was created in four months by Seymour Rubinstein after founding MicroPro International in 1978. WordStar is commonly attributed as the first WYSIWYG (what you see is what you get) editor, as the WordStar editor replicated the printed output.

Inspired by the success of WordStar by 1982 many competitors began to release their offerings, including WordPerfect in 1979, MultiMate in 1982, and Microsoft Word in 1983.

Early word processing software was not as intuitive as word processor devices. Most early word processing software required users to memorize semi-mnemonic key combinations rather than pressing keys such as "copy" or "bold". Moreover, CP/M lacked cursor keys; for example, WordStar used the E-S-D-X-centered "diamond" for cursor navigation. A notable exception was the software Lexitype for MS-DOS that took inspiration from the Lexitron dedicated word processor's user interface and which mapped individual functions to particular keyboard function keys, and a set of stick-on "keycaps" describing the function were provided with the software. Lexitype was popular with large organizations that had previously used the Lexitron. Eventually, the price differences between dedicated word processors and general-purpose PCs, and the value added to the latter by software such as "killer app" spreadsheet applications, e.g. VisiCalc and Lotus 1-2-3, were so compelling that personal computers and word processing software became serious competition for the dedicated machines and soon dominated the market. By 1988 WordPerfect and Word were the two leading word processors—with significantly more sales than DisplayWrite 4 and MultiMate—and far superior to dedicated word processor products. Both WordPerfect and Word frequently added features and lowered prices to compete with their rivals. Because the industry did not have a dominant product their prices were lower than spreadsheets like 1-2-3 or databases like dBASE, which cost up to twice as much.

In the late 1980s, innovations such as the advent of laser printers, a "typographic" approach to word processing (WYSIWYG - What You See Is What You Get), using bitmap displays with multiple fonts (pioneered by the Xerox Alto computer and Bravo word processing program), and graphical user interfaces such as “copy and paste” (another Xerox PARC innovation, with the Gypsy word processor). These were popularized by MacWrite on the Apple Macintosh in 1983, and Microsoft Word on the IBM PC in 1984. These were probably the first true WYSIWYG word processors to become known to many people. Of particular interest also is the standardization of TrueType fonts used in both Macintosh and Windows PCs. While the publishers of the operating systems provide TrueType typefaces, they are largely gathered from traditional typefaces converted by smaller font publishing houses to replicate standard fonts. Demand for new and interesting fonts, which can be found free of copyright restrictions, or commissioned from font designers, developed.

While hundreds of word-processing software existed in the 1980s, the growing popularity of Microsoft Windows in the 1990s narrowed the market to a few that supported the operating system, including Microsoft Word, WordPerfect, and Ami Pro. While DOS word processors by then offered WYSIWYG, multiple windows, and graphics, they lacked other Windows features such as OLE, DDE, and drag and drop. By 1991 Dataquest estimated that the "big three" Windows word processors had 96% of the market, with 55% for Word, 23% for WordPerfect, and 18% for Ami Pro.

Early in the 21st century, Google Docs popularized the transition to online or offline web browser based word processing. This was enabled by the widespread adoption of suitable internet connectivity in businesses and domestic households and later the popularity of smartphones. Google Docs enabled word processing from within any vendor's web browser, which could run on any vendor's operating system on any physical device type including tablets and smartphones, although offline editing is limited to a few Chromium based web browsers. Google Docs also enabled the significant growth of use of information technology such as remote access to files and collaborative real-time editing, both becoming simple to do with little or no need for costly software and specialist IT support.

Notable programs include:

Word processor programs
Word processor	Year
Electric Pencil	1976
WordStar	1978
WordPerfect	1979
EasyWriter	1979
IBM DisplayWrite	1981
MultiMate	1982
Volkswriter	1982
Microsoft Word	1983
MacWrite	1984
StarWriter	1985
Lotus Manuscript	1986
TextMaker	1987
Sprint	1987
IBM Lotus Word Pro	1988
Nisus Writer	1989
InPage	1994
WordPad	1995
TextEdit	1996
Ability Write	1996
KWord	1998
AbiWord	1998
Adobe InCopy	1999
Atlantis Word Processor	2000
Jarte	2001
OpenOffice.org Writer	2002
Mellel	2002
Pages	2005
JWPce	2005
Google Docs	2006
Scrivener	2007
WordGrinder	2007
PolyEdit	2010
LibreOffice Writer	2011
Apache OpenOffice Writer	2012
Calligra Words	2012
Collabora Online	2016

== See also ==
- Comparison of word processors
- Formatted text
- List of word processors
