= Comparison of Office Open XML and OpenDocument =

This is a comparison of computer document file formats Office Open XML and OpenDocument

== Comparison ==
File format	Office Open XML	OpenDocument
Based on a format developed by	Microsoft	StarDivision / Sun Microsystems
Predecessor file format	Microsoft Office XML formats	OpenOffice.org XML
Standardized by	Ecma International, ISO/IEC	OASIS, ISO/IEC
First public release date	2006	2005
First stable version	Ecma International Standard ECMA-376 Office Open XML File Formats 1st edition	OASIS OpenDocument Format for Office Applications (OpenDocument) v1.0
Latest stable version	ISO/IEC IS 29500-1:2012—Office Open XML File Formats	OASIS Open Document Format for Office Applications (OpenDocument) v1.4
Latest ISO/IEC standardised version	ISO/IEC IS 29500-1:2012—Office Open XML File Formats	ISO/IEC IS 26300-1:2015—Open Document Format for Office Applications (OpenDocument) v1.2
Language type	Markup language (XML)	Markup language (XML)
XML schema representation	XML Schema (W3C) (XSD) and RELAX NG (ISO/IEC 19757-2)	RELAX NG (ISO/IEC 19757-2)
Expression of extensibility rules	NVDL (ISO/IEC 19757-4)	
Compression format	ZIP	ZIP
Container structure	Open Packaging Conventions (ISO/IEC 29500-2:2021)	ODF Package
Metadata format	Dublin Core (ISO 15836)	subset of Dublin Core and “urn:oasis:names:tc:opendocument:xmlns:meta” elements
Drawing language	DrawingML, VML	“urn:oasis:names:tc:opendocument:xmlns:drawing” elements and “urn:oasis:names:tc:opendocument:xmlns:svg-compatible” elements
Mathematical notation language	Office MathML (OMML)	W3C MathML (ISO/IEC 40314)
Change-tracking	supported	supported
Conditional formatting in spreadsheets	supported	supported
Spreadsheet formula language	part of the standard	based on OpenFormula
Macro language	application-defined	application-defined
Digital signatures	part of the standard	supported
Thumbnails	JPEG (ISO/IEC 10918)	PNG (ISO/IEC 15948)
Interchange of digital font information	Open Font Format (ISO/IEC 14496-22)	Open Font Format (ISO/IEC 14496-22)
PANOSE font specifications	part of the standard	
Filename extensions	docx, docm, xlsx, xlsm, pptx, pptm	odt, ods, odp, odg, odf
Internet media types	application/vnd.openxmlformats-officedocument.wordprocessingml.document application/vnd.ms-word.document.macroEnabled.12 application/vnd.openxmlformats-officedocument.spreadsheetml.sheet application/vnd.ms-excel.sheet.macroEnabled.12 application/vnd.openxmlformats-officedocument.presentationml.presentation application/vnd.ms-powerpoint.presentation.macroEnabled.12	application/vnd.oasis.opendocument.text application/vnd.oasis.opendocument.spreadsheet application/vnd.oasis.opendocument.presentation application/vnd.oasis.opendocument.graphics application/vnd.oasis.opendocument.formula
Application support	Office Open XML software	OpenDocument software
Standard licensing	ISO/IEC copyrighted free download; Ecma copyrighted free download / copying allowed	ISO/IEC copyrighted free download; OASIS copyrighted free download / copying allowed
Additional technology patent licensing	Reasonable and non-discriminatory licensing (RAND-Z); Microsoft Open Specification Promise (OSP); Microsoft Covenant Not to Sue (CNS)	Sun Microsystems intellectual property covenant; IBM Interoperability Specifications Pledge
Implementations covered by patent license	Patent license covers conforming implementations	Patent license covers fully compliant implementations
File format	Office Open XML	OpenDocument

== See also ==
- Comparison of document markup languages
- Standardization of Office Open XML
- List of document markup languages
- Lightweight markup language
