= Standardization of Office Open XML =

The Office Open XML file formats, also known as OOXML, were standardised between December 2006 and November 2008, first by the Ecma International consortium (where they became ECMA-376), and subsequently, after a contentious standardization process, by the ISO/IEC's Joint Technical Committee 1 (where they became ISO/IEC 29500:2008).

== Standardization within Ecma International ==
More than a year after being asked by the European Union to standardize their Office 2003 XML formats, Microsoft submitted 2,000 pages of documentation for a new file format to the Ecma International consortium for it to be made into an open standard. Ecma formed a technical committee (TC45) in December 2005, in order to produce and maintain a "formal standard for office productivity applications that is fully compatible with the Office Open XML Formats, submitted by Microsoft". The technical committee was chaired by two Microsoft employees and included members drawn from Apple, Canon, Intel, NextPage, Novell, Pioneer, Statoil ASA, Toshiba, The United States Library of Congress, The British Library and the Gnome Foundation.

During standardisation within Ecma the specification grew to approximately 6,000 pages. It was approved as an Ecma standard (ECMA-376) on December 7, 2006. The standard can be downloaded from Ecma free of charge.

== International standardization ==
Using their entitlement as an ISO/IEC JTC 1 external Category A liaison, Ecma International submitted ECMA-376 to the JTC 1 fast track standardization process. To meet the requirements of this process, they submitted the documents "Explanatory report on Office Open XML Standard (Ecma-376) submitted to JTC 1 for fast-track" and "Licensing conditions that Microsoft offers for Office Open XML". ISO and IEC classified the specification as DIS 29500 (Draft International Standard 29500) Information technology – Office Open XML file formats.

The fast track process consists of a contradictions phase, a ballot phase, and a ballot resolution phase.

During the contradictions phase, ISO and IEC members submitted perceived contradictions to JTC 1. During the ballot phase the members voted on the specification as it was submitted by Ecma and submitted editorial and technical comments with their vote. In the ballot resolution phase the submitted comments were addressed and members were invited to reconsider their vote.

=== Interim ballot result ===
During the standardization of Office Open XML, Ecma International submitted its Office Open XML File Formats standard (ECMA-376) to the ISO Fast Track process. After a comment period, the ISO held a ballot that closed September 2007. This has been observed to be perhaps the most controversial and unusual ISO ballot ever convened, both in the number of comments in opposition, and in unusual actions during the voting process. Various factions have strongly supported and opposed this fast track process. On the supporting side were primarily Microsoft affiliated companies; on the opposing side were free- or open-source software organizations, IBM and affiliates, Sun Microsystems, and Google.

There have been reports of attempted vote buying, heated verbal confrontations, refusal to come to consensus and other very unusual behavior in national standards bodies. This is said to be unprecedented for standards bodies, which usually act together and have generally worked to resolve concerns amicably.

87 ISO member countries responded to the five-month ballot. There were 51 votes of "approval", 18 votes of "disapproval" and 18 abstentions. For the measure to pass, 2/3 of "P" members (participating, as opposed to "O" members: observing) must approve and less than 1/4 of all voting national members (excluding members that abstain from voting) must disapprove. The ballot shows 53% approval by "P" members and 26% disapproval from the total votes.

The following table shows the results by member of the balloting that ended 2 September 2007:

Country	Standards Body	Membership	Vote
Argentina	IRAM	O Member	Abstention
Chile	INN	O Member	Abstention
Israel	SII	O Member	Abstention
Luxembourg	SEE	O Member	Abstention
Mexico	DGN	O Member	Abstention
Peru	INDECOPI	O Member	Abstention
Vietnam	TCVN	O Member	Abstention
Australia	SA	P Member	Abstention
Belgium	NBN	P Member	Abstention
Finland	SFS	P Member	Abstention
Italy	UNI	P Member	Abstention
Malaysia	DSM	P Member	Abstention
Netherlands	NEN	P Member	Abstention
Slovenia	SIST	P Member	Abstention
Spain	AENOR	P Member	Abstention
Trinidad and Tobago	TTBS	P Member	Abstention
Mauritius	MSB		Abstention
Zimbabwe	SAZ		Abstention
Armenia	SARM	O Member	Approval
Belarus	BELST	O Member	Approval
Costa Rica	INTECO	O Member	Approval
Croatia	HZN	O Member	Approval
Cuba	NC	O Member	Approval
Egypt	EOS	O Member	Approval
Morocco	IMANOR	O Member	Approval
Romania	ASRO	O Member	Approval
Russian Federation	GOST R	O Member	Approval
Serbia	ISS	O Member	Approval
Sri Lanka	SLSI	O Member	Approval
Ukraine	DSSU	O Member	Approval
Azerbaijan	AZSTAND	P Member	Approval
Côte-d'Ivoire	CODINORM	P Member	Approval
Cyprus	CYS	P Member	Approval
Jamaica	JBS	P Member	Approval
Kazakhstan	KAZMEMST	P Member	Approval
Lebanon	LIBNOR	P Member	Approval
Pakistan	PSQCA	P Member	Approval
Saudi Arabia	SASO	P Member	Approval
Bangladesh	BSTI		Approval
Barbados	BNSI		Approval
Bosnia and Herzegovina	BAS		Approval
Congo, The Democratic Republic of	OCC		Approval
Fiji	FTSQCO		Approval
Kuwait	KOWSMD		Approval
Nigeria	SON		Approval
Panama	COPANIT		Approval
Qatar	QS		Approval
Syrian Arab Republic	SASMO		Approval
Tanzania, United Rep. of	TBS		Approval
United Arab Emirates	ESMA		Approval
Uzbekistan	UZSTANDARD		Approval
Austria	ON	O Member	Approval with comments
Bulgaria	BDS	O Member	Approval with comments
Colombia	ICONTEC	O Member	Approval with comments
Greece	ELOT	O Member	Approval with comments
Poland	PKN	O Member	Approval with comments
Portugal	IPQ	O Member	Approval with comments
Tunisia	INNORPI	O Member	Approval with comments
Germany	DIN	P Member	Approval with comments
Kenya	KEBS	P Member	Approval with comments
Malta	MSA	P Member	Approval with comments
Singapore	SPRING SG	P Member	Approval with comments
Switzerland	SNV	P Member	Approval with comments
Turkey	TSE	P Member	Approval with comments
Uruguay	UNIT	P Member	Approval with comments
Venezuela	FONDONORMA	P Member	Approval with comments
USA	ANSI	Secretariat	Approval with comments
Ghana	GSB		Approval with comments
Jordan	JISM		Approval with comments
Brazil	ABNT	O Member	Disapproval
Philippines	BPS	O Member	Disapproval
Thailand	TISI	O Member	Disapproval
Canada	SCC	P Member	Disapproval
China	SAC	P Member	Disapproval
Czech Republic	CNI	P Member	Disapproval
Denmark	DS	P Member	Disapproval
Ecuador	INEN	P Member	Disapproval
France	AFNOR	P Member	Disapproval
India	BIS	P Member	Disapproval
Iran, Islamic Republic of	ISIRI	P Member	Disapproval
Ireland	NSAI	P Member	Disapproval
Japan	JISC	P Member	Disapproval
Korea, Republic of	KATS	P Member	Disapproval
New Zealand	SNZ	P Member	Disapproval
Norway	SN	P Member	Disapproval
South Africa	SABS	P Member	Disapproval
United Kingdom	BSI	P Member	Disapproval

On 25–29 February 2008, a Ballot Resolution Meeting was held in Geneva, Switzerland, to consider revisions to the OOXML proposal. Under ISO rules, national standards bodies have thirty days following the Ballot Resolution Meeting to reconsider and possibly change their votes.

Belgium
The Belgian Bureau de Normalisation considered the revisions, but failed to reach a consensus on the proposal. Belgium's initial abstention therefore stood.
Czech Republic
The Český Normalizační Institut considered the revisions and changed its initial vote against the proposal to a vote in favour.
Germany
The Normenausschuss Informationstechnik und Anwendungen considered the revisions and reaffirmed Germany's initial vote for the proposal.
India
The Bureau of Indian Standards considered the revisions and reaffirmed India's initial vote against the proposal.
Netherlands
The Netherlands Standardization Institute (NEN) considered the revisions and reaffirmed the Netherlands' initial abstention.
Trinidad and Tobago
The Trinidad and Tobago Bureau of Standards announced that it will change its initial abstention to a vote for the revised proposal.
United States
The International Committee on Information Technology Standards (INCITS) considered the revisions and reaffirmed the U.S.'s initial vote for the proposal.

In September 2007 eighty-seven ISO and IEC member countries had responded to the ballot. There were 51 votes of "approval", 18 votes of "disapproval" and 18 abstentions. "P-members", who were required to vote, had to approve by 66.67% for the text to be approved. The P-members voted 17 in favour out of 32, below the required threshold for approval. Also, no more than 25% of the total member votes may be negative for the text to be approved, and this requirement was also not met since 26% of the total votes were negative. The standardization process then entered its ballot resolution phase, described below.

=== Response to ballot comments ===
Ecma produced a draft "Disposition of Comments" document that addresses the 1,027 distinct "NB comments" (that is, comments by national bodies) that had been submitted in the letter ballot phase. This document comprised 1,600 pages of commentary and proposed changes. The ISO and IEC members had 6 weeks to review this draft, and had an opportunity to participate in several informal conference call sessions with the Ecma TC45 to discuss it before the BRM.

=== Ballot resolution process ===
A Ballot Resolution Meeting (BRM) is an integral part of the ballot resolution phase. The outcome of, and period following, this meeting decided whether DIS 29500 succeeded or failed in its bid to become an International Standard. The DIS 29500 BRM took place in late February 2008.

At the BRM, 873 proposed changes to the specification were submitted by Ecma (of their 1,027 responses, 154 proposed no change). Of these only 20% were discussed and modified in meeting sessions, given the 5 day time limit of the meeting. The remaining 80% were not discussed and were subject to a voting mechanism approved by the meeting (see Resolution 37 of the meeting resolutions cited below). Using this voting mechanism NBs could approve, disapprove or abstain on each and every one of these proposed changes. This allowed a set of approved changes to be decided upon without discussion.

With the original submitted draft used as the base, all the agreed-upon changes were applied by the Project Editor to create a new set of documents incorporating the changes agreed during the BRM. In parallel with this, NBs had 30 days after the BRM in which to decide whether to amend their votes of September 2, 2007.

=== Ballot result ===
A number of JTC 1 members took the opportunity to amend their votes, predominantly in favour of approval of DIS 29500. Thus, on April 2, 2008, ISO and IEC officially stated that the DIS 29500 had been approved for acceptance as an ISO/IEC Standard, pending any appeals. They stated that "75% of the JTC 1 participating member votes cast positive and 14% of the total of national member body votes cast negative" In accordance with the JTC 1 directives the Project Editor had created a new version of the final text within a month of the BRM. After review, corrections and the resolution of appeals, this text was distributed to the members of SC34.

=== Appeals ===
Four JTC 1 members appealed the standardisation: the bodies of South Africa, Brazil, India and Venezuela. Since the appeals system is designed to find a solution by consensus, it was unlikely that the process would have resulted in ISO/IEC abandoning progress of DIS 29500. The CEOs of ISO and IEC advised the management board that these appeals should no longer be processed any further: the Secretary General of ISO is reported as stating: "[t]he processing of the ISO/IEC DIS 29500 project has been conducted in conformity with the ISO/IEC JTC 1 Directives, with decisions determined by the votes expressed by the relevant ISO and IEC national bodies under their own responsibility, and consequently, for the reasons mentioned above, the appeals should not be processed further".

The main issue in the appeals was the BRM procedures. The 3 appealing countries did not appeal during the BRM and even all voted approval on the resolution that allowed for voting on each of the resolutions that had not been discussed in the plenary meeting through means of a form. The three countries appealing used that form vote for a disapproval vote of most of the responses (in total only 4 countries did that) but failed to have a significant number of responses disapproved.

The appeals did not get sufficient support of the National Bodies voting on the ISO and IEC management boards, and consequently the go-ahead was given to publish ISO/IEC DIS 29500, Information technology – Office Open XML formats, as an ISO/IEC International Standard on August 15, 2008.

=== Publication ===
The International Standard ISO/IEC 29500:2008 was published in November 2008.

=== Maintenance regime ===
Following the standardization of ISO/IEC 29500, ISO/IEC JTC 1/SC 34, as the designated maintenance group for the standard, established two ad hoc groups for deciding how the Standard would be maintained: a group to collect comments on the newly approved standard, and a group to decide what structures should be used for long-term maintenance. The resulting recommendation was that ISO/IEC JTC 1/SC 34 should assume full control of the maintenance work on ISO/IEC 29500. This decision was duly ratified at SC 34's September 2008 meeting on Jeju Island, Korea. Ecma were invited as a liaison to provide individual experts to contribute to the maintenance activity. This decision superseded an earlier proposal from Ecma, in which Ecma itself proposed it was responsible for maintenance.

On May 21, 2008, Microsoft announced that it would be "an active participant in the future evolution of ODF, Open XML, XPS and PDF standards".

ISO/IEC 29500 is maintained within Working Group 4 ("WG 4") of ISO/IEC JTC 1/SC 34 under the convenorship of MURATA Makoto of Japan.

Under this maintenance regime the JTC 1 Directives apply, and these stipulate that:

- Proposals to amend the text, and acceptance of any such amendments, are subject to normal JTC 1 voting processes (JTC 1 Directives clause 15.5)
- The standard cannot be "stabilised" (no longer subject to periodic maintenance) except through approval in a JTC 1 ballot (JTC 1 Directives, clause 15.6.2).
- For the standard to be stabilised it must have passed through one review cycle (JTC 1 Directives, clause 15.6.1). In this review cycle, the text would have to have been re-written to comply with ISO's formatting and verbal requirements (JTC 1 Directives, clause 13.4).

WG 4 has a web site and open document register. Defect logs and statistics from WG 4 are available online.

At the WG4 meeting in Copenhagen, June 22–24, 2009, there were 16 people listed as present; 5 of these were employed by Microsoft, 4 by universities.

== Reactions to standardization ==
=== Complaints about the national bodies process ===
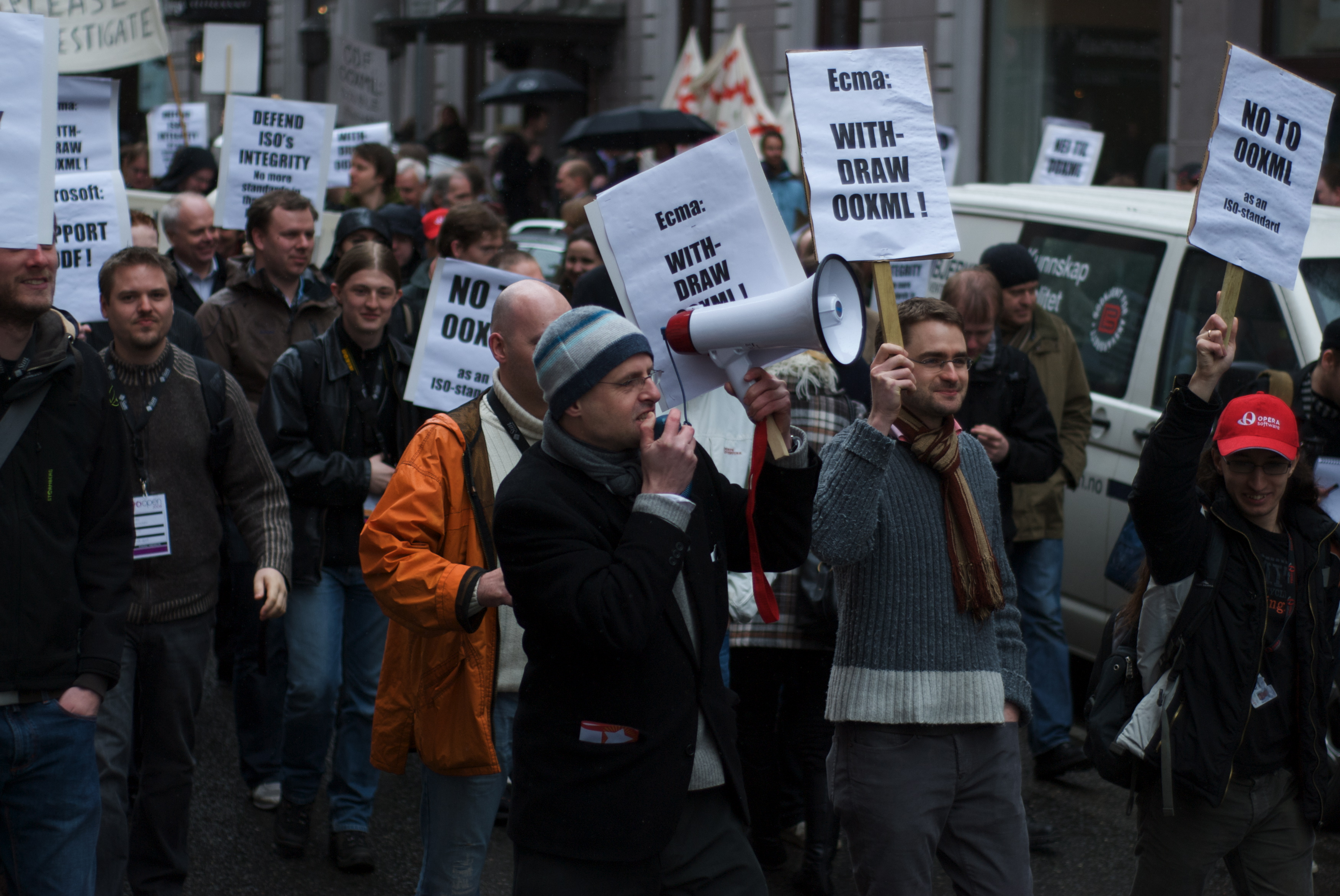
Protest against OOXML ISO standardization in Oslo, Norway

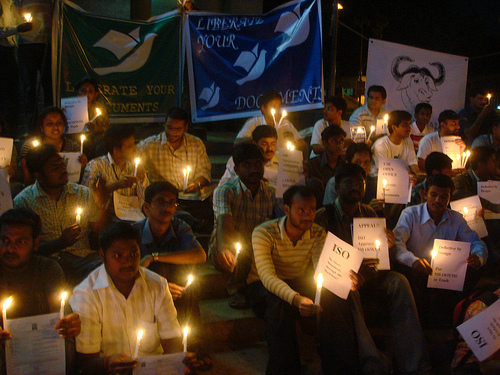
Office Open XML ISO standardization protest in Bangalore, India

There have been allegations that the ISO ballot process for Office Open XML was marred with voting irregularities and heavy-handed tactics by some stakeholders.

- An Ars Technica article sources Groklaw stating that at Portugal's national body TC meeting, "representatives from Microsoft attempted to argue that Sun Microsystems, the creators and supporters of the competing OpenDocument format (ODF), could not be given a seat at the conference table because there was a lack of chairs."
- In Sweden, Microsoft notified the Swedish Standards Institute (SIS) that an employee sent a memo to two of its partners, requesting them to join the SIS committee and vote in favor of Office Open XML in return for "marketing contributions". Jason Matusow, a Director in the Corporate Standards Strategy Team at Microsoft, stated that the memo was the action of an individual employee acting outside company policy, and that the memo was retracted as soon as it was discovered. SIS have since changed its voting procedure so that a member has to actually participate before being allowed to vote.
- Sweden invalidated its vote (80% was for approval) as one company cast more than one vote, which is against SIS policy.
- Finnish IT journalists described that meeting as raising strong differences in opinions.
- In Switzerland, SNV registered a vote of "approval with comments," and there was some criticism about a "conflict of interest" regarding the chairman of the UK 14 sub-committee, who did not allow discussion of licensing, economic and political arguments. In addition, the chairman of the relevant SNV parent committee is also the secretary general of Ecma International, which approved OOXML as a standard. Further complaints regarded "committee stuffing", which is however allowed by present SNV rules, and non-adherence to SNV rules by the UK 14 chairman, which resulted in a re-vote with the same result.
- Australia's national standards body, Standards Australia, was criticized for its handling of the OOXML process by the New Zealand Open Source Society, the open source advisory firm Waugh Partners, Australian National University Professor Roger Clarke, OASIS lawyer Andrew Updegrove, IBM and Google. Standards Australia sent ISO SC 34 expert and XML and Schematron specialist Rick Jelliffe to the BRM, despite critics alleging that Jelliffe would not represent the views of those opposing the standardization. Jelliffe had previously been in the news after being offered payment by Microsoft to improve incorrect Wikipedia articles about Office Open XML. Microsoft had bought a schema conversion tool from his company and he had performed the initial conversion of the Office Open XML schemas from XML Schemas to RELAX NG, both schema languages he had been involved in standardizing. It was alleged that Standards Australia had broken a previous public pledge to send two internal employees to the BRM. However Standards Australia issued a press release denying this and stating that the Computerworld article was "riddled with inaccuracies and misrepresentations."
- Norway's vote was decided by Standard Norge; the mostly opposing viewpoints of the technical committee resulted in a disapproval vote in the 2007 ballot. However, the administration of Standard Norge changed Norway's vote to "approval" in 2008 even if the majority of the committee argued in favor of keeping its "disapproval" vote. Membership in the technical committee had risen from 6–7 to 30 members; all of the pre-OOXML members argued in favour of a "no" vote. In October 2008, 13 of the 23 members, 12 of which are associated with the open-source movement, resigned after OOXML was ratified by ISO and all appeals were rejected.
- The IDABC community programme (which is managed by the European Commission) runs the "Open Source Observatory" which is "dedicated to Free/Libre/Open Source Software." Via its "Open Source News", it has reported on reports which criticize the standardization process.
  - It states that the German IT news site Heise reports that in Germany, two opponents of Office Open XML, Deutsche Telekom and Google, were not allowed to vote because they tried to join the committee last-minute. Open Source News says, "Participants described the process as ludicrous."
  - It relays a report from Michiel Leenaars (director of the Internet Society Netherlands) that in the Netherlands, "the chair of the national standardization committee deciding on OOXML, protested that the almost unanimous conditional approval was blocked by Microsoft."
  - It reports on a report from Borys Musielak, a member of Poland's Linux community, who wrote on the PolishLinux website that Poland's technical committee KT 171 rejected Office Open XML. The vote was invalidated and assigned to KT 182. A member of Poland's Linux community believes this was due to "reorganisation in the Polish standardisation body." KT 182 voted to approve Office Open XML.
  - It reports that in Andalucía, the director of Andalucía's Department for Innovation complained that Microsoft submitted misinformation to the Spanish National Body stating that it (Andalucía) supported the company's Office Open XML-proposal.
  - It reports that in Portugal, eleven companies (including IBM) and open source advocacy groups requested that Portugal's Ministry of Economy and Innovation investigate Portugal's vote on Office Open XML.
- In June 2008, the High Court of Justice in the United Kingdom rejected a complaint by the UK Unix and Open Systems User Group (UKUUG), requesting a review of the British Standard Institution's decision to vote in favour of DIS 29500. The judge commented that "this application does not disclose any arguable breach of the procedures of BSI or of rules of procedural fairness".

=== Other complaints ===
A further letter of protest was filed by Open Source Leverandørforeningen, a Danish open source vendor association although no appeal has been filed directly by Dansk Standard itself.

In September 2008, a joint letter known as the Consegi declaration was issued and signed by 3 representatives for free software of the countries that issued appeals (South Africa, Brazil and Venezuela) as well as Ecuador, Cuba and Paraguay.

After the specification was officially accepted as an ISO standard, Red Hat and IBM claimed the ISO is losing credibility, and Ubuntu founder Mark Shuttleworth commented "We're not going to invest in trying to implement a standard that is poorly defined." IBM issued a press release stating: "IBM will continue to be an active supporter of ODF. We look forward to being part of the community that works to harmonize ODF and OOXML for the sake of consumers, companies and governments, when OOXML control and maintenance is fully transferred to JTC1."

=== Examination of fast track process ===
Deutsches Institut für Normung (DIN, Germany) voted "yes" on DIS 29500, and stated that DIN as a whole "recognised that there has been no serious breach of JTC 1 and ISO rules", but that, "the conclusion has been reached that the rules for the fast-track procedure need to be amended".

At the plenary meeting of JTC 1 in Nara, Japan that took place in November 2008, a resolution was passed which related to concerns expressed during the standardisation of ISO/IEC 29500. Resolution 49 was entitled "Clarification on Consistency of Standards vs Competing Specifications" and contained the following text:

JTC 1 recognizes its commitment to ISO's and IEC's "one standard" principle; however, it recognizes that neither it nor its SCs are in a position to mandate either the creation or the use of a single standard, and that there are times when multiple standards make the most sense in order to respond to the needs of the marketplace and of society at large. It is not practical to define, a priori, criteria for making these decisions. Therefore each standard must be judged by the National Bodies, based on their markets, on its own merits.

At a companion meeting of the Special Working Group on Directives (SWG-Directives) in Osaka a recommendation was made describing series of "concepts" that would in future be applied to the Ballot Resolution process of future Fast Tracked standards. These mirrored the process that had taken place for ISO/IEC 29500:

1. The purpose is to review and address ballot comments
2. The meeting must have a separate agenda and be convened as a separate meeting even if it is in conjunction with/co-located with an SC/WG meeting
3. The comments must be discussed within a single meeting and NOT distributed over a series of meetings
4. The meeting is open to the Fast track Submitter and to all National Bodies regardless of whether or not the National Body has voted on the document under review – no limitation on which National Body can participate
5. The meeting participants represent their National Body and their National Body positions
6. All National Bodies have an equal say in any decisions made during the meeting
7. The Project Editor must prepare an Editor's proposed disposition of ballot comments in sufficient time prior to the BRM to allow consideration by National Bodies. This editor's proposed disposition of comments document will be reviewed during the ballot resolution meeting
8. A disposition of ballot comments approved during the meeting must be circulated following the meeting for the information of all National Bodies
9. When all comments have been addressed and a disposition of comments has been approved by the meeting, the BRM meeting criteria have been met

Standards lawyer Andy Updegrove (whose firm represents OASIS) commented that he was "startled and dismayed" at these concepts, since they "basically add up to a ratification of the conduct of the Geneva BRM."

=== Investigation of Microsoft by the European Commission ===
In January 2008, the European Commission started an antitrust investigation into the interoperability of the Office Open XML format on the request of European Committee for Interoperable Systems, described as "a coalition of Microsoft's largest competitors". Anonymous source(s) of the Wall Street Journal claim that this investigation also includes an investigation into whether Microsoft violated antitrust laws in the course of the standardization process. The Financial Times reports that European ISO members have confirmed receipt of a letter by the European Commission "asking how they prepared for votes [...] on acceptance of Microsoft's OOXML document format as a worldwide standard."

=== Microsoft complaints about competitors ===
On February 14, 2007, Microsoft attacked IBM's opposition to the Office Open XML standardization process in an open letter, saying

On December 7, Ecma approved the adoption of Open XML as an international open standard. The vote was nearly unanimous; of the 21 members, IBM's was the sole dissenting vote. IBM again was the lone dissenter when Ecma also agreed to submit Open XML as a standard for ratification by ISO/IEC JTC1. IBM led a global campaign urging national bodies to demand that ISO/IEC JTC1 not even consider Open XML, because ODF had made it through ISO/IEC JTC1 first.

Nicos Tsilas, Microsoft's senior director of interoperability and intellectual property policy, downplaying Microsoft's American and EU conviction as abusers of monopoly power, expressed concern that IBM and the Free Software Foundation have been lobbying governments to mandate the use of the rival OpenDocument format (ODF) to the exclusion of other formats. In his opinion, they are "using government intervention as a way to compete" as they "couldn't compete technically."

IBM have asked governments to have an open-source, exclusive purchasing policy.

== Arguments in support and criticism of Office Open XML standard ==
=== Support ===
Microsoft believes its own format should be adopted. It has presented this argument on its "community web site", a site owned and operated by Microsoft.

Sun Microsystems initially voted against approval of DIS 29500 in the INCITS V1 committee, but stated on the committee mailing list "We wish to make it completely clear that we support DIS 29500 becoming an ISO Standard and are in complete agreement with its stated purposes of enabling interoperability among different implementations and providing interoperable access to the legacy of Microsoft Office documents" and that "We voted in the expectation that [...] changes will be made and that a version of DIS 29500 capable of achieving its objectives would be approved as an ISO Standard.".

ODF Alliance India published an extensive technical report in 2007 containing concrete issues by members of the association, as well as replies from Microsoft.

In December 2007 Ecma International announced that many reported issues will be taken into account in next edition of the standardisation proposal to ISO.

- The British Library and the United States Library of Congress have participated in the work of Ecma TC45 and support the Office Open XML standard.
- Former Gnome Foundation board member Miguel de Icaza, who started the GNOME and Mono projects, showed support for the Office Open XML document format, stating "OOXML is a superb standard and yet, it has been FUDed so badly by its competitors that serious people believe that there is something fundamentally wrong with it."
- Patrick Durusau, the editor of the OpenDocument standard, has characterized OOXML as a "poster child for the open standards development process"

==== User base ====
The most widely used office productivity packages currently rely on various proprietary and reverse engineered binary file formats such as those created by successive releases of Microsoft Word, PowerPoint and Excel. However, OOXML is a new format which is not backwards or forwards compatible with any of the old Microsoft Office formats.

==== Policy arguments ====
With regards to the alleged overlap in scope with the OpenDocument format, Ecma has provided the following policy arguments in favor of standardization: overlap in scope of ISO/IEC standards is common and can serve a practical purpose; Office Open XML addresses distinct user requirements; The OpenDocument Format and Office Open XML are structured to meet different user requirements; and Office Open XML and OpenDocument can serve as duo-standards.

==== Technical arguments ====
A study comparing IS 29500:2008 and IS 26300:2006 (ODF 1.0) by the German Fraunhofer Society found

It may be concluded that many of the functionalities, especially those found in simpler documents, can be translated between the standards, while the translation of other functionalities can prove complex or even impossible.

- The use of the Open Packaging Conventions which allows for indirection, chunking and relative indirection.
- Uses the ZIP format, making ZIP part of the standard. Due to compression, files are smaller than current binary formats.
- It supports custom data elements for integration of data specific to an application or an organisation that wants to use the format.
- It defines spreadsheet formulas.
- Office Open XML contains alternate representations for the XML schemas and extensibility mechanisms using RELAX NG (ISO/IEC 19757-2) and NVDL (ISO/IEC 19757-4.)
- No restriction on image, audio or video types, Book 1 §14.2.12.
- Embedded controls can be of any type, such as Java or ActiveX, Book 1 §15.2.8.
- WordprocessingML font specifications can include font metrics and PANOSE information to assist in finding a substitution font if the original is not available, Book 3 §2.10.5.
- In the situation where a consuming application might not be capable of interpreting what a producing application wrote, Office Open XML defines an Alternate Content Block which can represent said data in an alternate format, such as an image. Book 3 §2.18.4.
- Internationalization support. For example, date representation: In WordprocessingML (Book 4 §2.18.7) and SpreadsheetML (Book 4 §3.18.5), calendar dates after 1900 CE can be written using Gregorian (three variants), Hebrew, Hijri, Japanese (Emperor Era), Korean (Tangun Era), Saka, Taiwanese, and Thai formats. Also, there are several internationalization-related spreadsheet conversion functions.
- Custom XML schema extensibility allows the addition of features to the format. This can, for instance, facilitate conversion from other formats and future features that are not part of the official specification.

=== Criticism ===
==== Technical ====
The standard has been the subject of debate within the software industry. At over 6,000 pages, the specification is difficult to evaluate quickly. Objectors also claim that there could be user confusion regarding the two standards because of the similarity of the "Office Open XML" name to both "OpenDocument" and "OpenOffice". Objectors also argued that an ISO standard for documents already exists and there is no need for a second standard.

Google stated that "the ODF standard, which achieves the same goal, is only 867 pages" and that

If ISO were to give OOXML with its 6546 pages the same level of review that other standards have seen, it would take 18 years (6576 days for 6546 pages) to achieve comparable levels of review to the existing ODF standard (871 days for 867 pages) which achieves the same purpose and is thus a good comparison.

Considering that OOXML has only received about 5.5% of the review that comparable standards have undergone, reports about inconsistencies, contradictions and missing information are hardly surprising.

Those who support the ODF standard include the FFII, ODF Alliance IBM, as well as South Africa, and other nations that voiced strong opposition to OOXML during standardization.

The ODF Alliance UK Action Group has stated that with OpenDocument an ISO standard for Office files already exists. Further, they argue that the Office Open XML file-format is heavily based on Microsoft's own Office applications and is thus not vendor-neutral, and that it has inconsistencies with existing ISO standards such as time and date formats and color codes.

==== Process manipulation ====
In addition, the standardization process itself has been questioned, including claims of balloting irregularities by some technical committees, Microsoft representatives and Microsoft partners in trying to get Office Open XML approved. "The editorial group who actually produce the spec is referred to as "ECMA", but in fact the work is mostly done by Microsoft people."

=== Post-adoption quotes ===
During a panel discussion on Red Hat Summit in Boston in June 2008 Microsoft's national technology officer Stuart McKee said that "ODF has clearly won". He also made the following statement:

We found ourselves so far down the path of the standardisation process with no knowledge. We don't have a standards office. We didn't have a standards department in the company. I think the one thing that we would acknowledge and that we were frustrated with is that, by the time we realised what was going on and the competitive environment that was underway, we were late and there was a lot of catch-up. It was very difficult to enter into conversations around the world where the debate had already been framed.

On June 25, 2008, Gray Knowlton, a Group Product Manager for the Microsoft Office system made the following statements regarding the future of Open XML:

Microsoft will continue to support the development of the specification and the adoption of the Open XML formats, in addition to the other work we are driving around document formats in Office. [...] In the end, Open XML is still the better choice for the compatibility and line-of-business interoperability scenarios we have discussed throughout its history. [...] while we are working on ODF moving forward, we will remain committed to Open XML and believe that it will be the format of choice for large parts of the global community.

In an interview, Richard Stallman, head of the Free Software Foundation, said:

Microsoft corrupted many members of ISO in order to win approval for its phony 'open' document format, OOXML. This was so governments that keep their documents in a Microsoft-only format can pretend that they are using 'open standards.' The government of South Africa has filed an appeal against the decision, citing the irregularities in the process.

On March 31, 2010, Dr Alex Brown, who had been the Convener of the February 2008 Ballot Resolution Meeting, posted an entry on his personal blog in which he complained of Microsoft's lack of progress in adapting current and future versions of Microsoft Office to produce files in the Strict (as opposed to the Transitional) ISO 29500 format:

On this count Microsoft seems set for failure. In its pre-release form Office 2010 supports not the approved Strict variant of OOXML, but the very format the global community rejected in September 2007, and subsequently marked as not for use in new documents—the Transitional variant. Microsoft are behaving as if the JTC 1 standardisation process never happened...

Microsoft responded that the next release of Microsoft Office (version 15) would fully support ISO/IEC 29500 Strict.

== See also ==
- OpenDocument standardization
- Comparison of Office Open XML and OpenDocument
- Comparison of document markup languages
