= Template (file format) =

File template used by software as the basis for new documents

In file formats, a document template is a common feature of many software applications that define a unique non-executable file format intended specifically for that particular application.

== Templates ==
Template file formats are those whose file extension indicates that the file type is intended as a high starting point from which to create other files.

These types of files are usually indicated on the Save As ... file dialog box of the application.

For example, the word processing application Microsoft Word uses different file extensions for documents and templates: In Word 2003 the file extension .dot is used to indicate a template, in contrast to .doc for a standard document. In Word 2007 and later versions, it's .dotx, instead of .docx for documents.

The OpenDocument Format also has templates in its specification, with .ott as the filename extension for OpenDocument Text template.

In Adobe Dreamweaver the .dwt extension is used to indicate a template.

=== Microsoft Word Templates ===
Microsoft Word allows creating both layout and content templates. A layout template is a style guide for the file styles. It usually contains a chapter which explains how to use the styles within the documents. A content template is a document which provides a table of contents. It might be modified to correspond to the user's needs.

The word "Template" here means "a pre-formatted file type that can be used to quickly create a specific file". Everything such as font, size, color and background pictures are pre-formatted but users can also edit them. The word "Template" also refer to resource where already prepared samples is presented. Users can choose to download ready to use templates rather spending time to prepare it.

== See also ==
- File extension
- File format
- List of file formats
