= OpenDocument standardization =

The Open Document Format for Office Applications, commonly known as OpenDocument, was based on OpenOffice.org XML as used in OpenOffice.org version 1, and was standardised in 2005 by the Organization for the Advancement of Structured Information Standards (OASIS) consortium.

== Process ==
=== OpenDocument 1.0 ===
The first steps towards the OpenDocument standard were at a meeting of the DKUUG standardisation committee on August 28, 2001. The first official OASIS meeting to discuss the standard was on December 16, 2002; OASIS approved OpenDocument as an OASIS standard on May 1, 2005.

The group decided to build on an earlier version of the OpenOffice.org XML format, since this was already an XML format with most of the desired properties, and had been in use since 2000 as the program's primary storage format. However, OpenDocument is not the same as the older OpenOffice.org XML format.

According to Gary Edwards, a member of the OpenDocument technical committee, the specification was developed in two phases. Phase one (which lasted from November 2002 through March 2004) had the goal of ensuring that the OpenDocument format could capture all the data from a vast array of older legacy systems apart from Microsoft Office. Phase Two focused on Open Internet based collaboration.

OASIS is one of the organizations which has been granted the right to propose standards directly to an ISO SC for "fast-track processing". This process is designed to allow an existing standard from any source be submitted without modification directly for vote as a 'Draft International Standard (DIS) or Draft Amendment (DAM). Accordingly, OASIS submitted the OpenDocument standard to JTC 1/SC 34 Document description and processing languages – a joint technical committee of the International Organization for Standardization (ISO) and the International Electrotechnical Commission (IEC) – for approval as an international ISO/IEC standard. It was accepted as ISO/IEC DIS 26300, Open Document Format for Office Applications (OpenDocument) v1.0 draft International Standard (DIS), and it was published on November 30, 2006 as ISO/IEC 26300:2006 Information technology – Open Document Format for Office Applications (OpenDocument) v1.0.

=== OpenDocument 1.1 ===
After the Open Document Format for Office Applications (OpenDocument) v1.0 was accepted as an ISO/IEC standard, OASIS updated their standard to v1.1 in 2007. This update includes additional features to address accessibility concerns. It was approved as an OASIS Standard on 2007-02-01 following a call for vote issued on 2007-01-16. The public announcement was made on 2007-02-13. This version was not initially submitted to ISO/IEC, because it is considered to be a minor update to ODF 1.0 only, and OASIS were working already on ODF 1.2 at the time ODF 1.1 was approved. Some years later, it was submitted to ISO/IEC and published in March 2012 as ISO/IEC 26300:2006/Amd 1:2012 – Open Document Format for Office Applications (OpenDocument) v1.1.

=== OpenDocument 1.2 ===
OpenDocument v1.2 was approved as an OASIS Committee Specification on 17 March 2011 and as an OASIS Standard on 29 September 2011. It includes additional accessibility features, RDF-based metadata, a spreadsheet formula specification based on OpenFormula, support for digital signatures, and some features suggested by the public. OpenDocument 1.2 consists of three parts: Part 1: OpenDocument Schema, Part 2: Recalculated Formula (OpenFormula) Format and Part 3: Packages.

In October 2013, after a one-month review period for OASIS members, the OASIS Open Document Format for Office Applications (OpenDocument) Technical Committee requested that OASIS submit ODF 1.2 to the ISO/IEC Joint Technical Committee 1 (JTC1) for approval as a proposed International Standard under JTC1's "Publicly Available Specification" (PAS) transposition procedure. This submission happened in late March 2014. The Draft International Standard (DIS) received unanimous approval by the ISO national bodies in September 2014, as well as a number of comments that needed to be resolved. It was published as an ISO/IEC international standard on 17 June 2015.

=== OpenDocument 1.3 ===
OpenDocument 1.3 was approved as an OASIS standard on 2021-04-27. The most important new features of ODF 1.3 are digital signatures for documents and OpenPGP-based encryption of XML documents, with improvements in areas such as change tracking and document security, additional details in the description of elements in first pages, text, numbers and charts, and other timely improvements.

OpenDocument 1.3 is being developed as an ISO standard: as of March 2024 it was at Draft International Standard stage pending national comments and preparation of the Final Draft International Standard.

=== OpenDocument 1.4 ===
OpenDocument 1.4 was approved as an OASIS Open standard on 2025-12-03.. The specification can be found on the Oasis Open site.

Open Document Format for Office Applications (OpenDocument) Version 1.4.

- Part 1: Introduction (8 pages)
- Part 2: Packages (34 pages)
- Part 3: OpenDocument Schema (802 pages)
- Part 4: Recalculated Formula (OpenFormula) Format (213 pages)
- Schemas: RELAX NG schemas are available for the various XML languages. (The main schema is 18572 lines.)

=== OpenDocument version history ===
OpenDocument version history
OpenDocument version	OASIS Standard approved on	ISO/IEC Standard published on
OpenDocument 1.0	2005-05-01	2006-11-30
OpenDocument 1.1	2007-02-02	2012-03-08
OpenDocument 1.2	2011-09-29	2015-06-17
OpenDocument 1.3	2021-04-27	(in Final Committee Draft stage)
OpenDocument 1.4	2025-12-03	(not submitted yet)

== Participants ==
The standardization process included the vendors of office suites or related document systems, including (in alphabetical order):

- Adobe (Framemaker, Distiller)
- Corel (WordPerfect)
- IBM (Lotus 1-2-3, Workplace)
- KDE (Calligra, formerly KOffice)
- Sun Microsystems (StarOffice/OpenOffice.org)

Document-using organizations who initiated or were involved in the standardization process included (alphabetically):

- Boeing
- Intel (they are developing sample documents as a test suite) (Bastian, 2005)
- National Archives of Australia
- Attorney General of New York
- Novell (Berlind, October 25, 2005)
- Society of Biblical Literature
- Sony
- Stellent

As well as having formal members, draft versions of the specification were released to the public and subject to worldwide review. External comments were then adjudicated publicly by the committee.

== See also ==
- Standardization of Office Open XML
