= ITTF =

ITTF may refer to:

- Information Technology Task Force, a body supporting ICT standardisation
- International Table Tennis Federation, an international sports governing body for all national table tennis associations
