= Consegi declaration =

The Consegi declaration is a joint letter issued in September 2008 at a free and open technology convention, in which a number of government open source software representatives for the developing world (Brazil, South Africa, Venezuela, Ecuador, Cuba and Paraguay) state disappointment in the appeals by several of their ISO/IEC national bodies being dismissed by the ISO and IEC technical management boards in the Standardization of Office Open XML, and criticize the ISO/IEC for "inability to follow its own rules".

As a consequence of this, the signers assert that they will re-assess the credibility of ISO/IEC, and that they will no longer consider ISO standards to be automatically valid for government use.

== See also ==
- Standardization of Office Open XML
