= .dk =

Top-level Internet domain for Denmark

- Introduced: 14 July 1987
- TLD type: Country code top-level domain
- Status: Active
- Registry: Punktum dk
- Sponsor: Dansk Internet Forum
- Intended use: Entities connected with Denmark
- Actual use: Very popular in Denmark
- Registered domains: 1,460,530 (2022-12-15)
- Registration restrictions: None
- Structure: Registrations permitted at second level
- Documents: Terms and conditions for the right of use to a .dk domain name
- Dispute policies: The Danish Complaints Board for Domain Names
- DNSSEC: Yes
- Registry website: Punktum dk

.dk is the country code top-level domain (ccTLD) for Denmark. The supervision of the .dk top-level domain is handled exclusively by Punktum dk. Any new .dk domain name has to be applied for via an approved registrar. Then the domain name applicant can ask the registrar to manage their domain name or have it managed directly by the Punktum dk. Registrations of domain names with the characters æ, ø, å, ö, ä, ü, é, and ẞ are also allowed.

== History ==
The country code top-level domain .dk was created July 14, 1987, at ARPA Network Information Center, Stanford Research Institute (SRI-NIC). The Danish UNIX User Group (DKUUG) at Datalogisk Institut, Københavns Universitet (DIKU) received management of the .dk domain on the DKnet, at that time an informal name used for the UUCP network used at DIKU and other places in Denmark. The name DKnet has been in use since at least 1985.

In mid-1988 DKnet was connected to the emerging DENet, the government-sponsored research network established in late 1987 now known as forskningsnettet, run and maintained by UNI-C.

In November 1987 DKUUG made a name agreement ("navneaftalen") with the coordinators of the three other networks then working in Denmark, a national experimental X.400 net (EAN from University of British Columbia), EARN and DECnet, concerning the .dk domain. They agreed to share it, hiding from the users which network they were connected to, and nullifying the use of pseudo-domains like .uucp or second-level domains like gov.uk, thereby creating a practice that has been enforced ever since, and also applied in other countries.

By early 1992 UNI-C via DENet (an acronym for "Danish Educational Network") serviced all the Universities in Denmark, and DIKU had no need for DKnet anymore. Thus DKUUG, with DKnet, moved to Symbion Science Park where they received their own international lines and started to lease these to companies, and modem connections to private consumers. The growing business quickly overshadowed the organization's own economy, forcing the creation of a separate company. In 1993, DKnet ApS, a genuine ISP and Denmark's first, was established as a limited liability company (ApS).

In 1996, with the establishment of the Danish Research Network, the name "DENet" was used for the commercial part of the network and changed to be an acronym for "Dansk Erhvervs Net", i.e. Danish Business Network.

=== Tele Danmark takes over ===
On February 15, 1996, DKnet ApS, including the .dk domain management, was sold by DKUUG to Tele Danmark (now TDC) at the price of 20 million DKK. Acknowledging the possible conflict of interest of a company (Tele Denmark) behind both a commercial ISP (DKnet A/S, now a stock company) and also in control of the .dk domain management (Punktum dk), a group of tele- and internet companies, 28 in all, including TeliaSonera, Global One, Deutsche Telekom, IBM, assembled five days after the purchase in order to gain control of the Punktum dk function.

Tele Danmark initially refused, and the group together formed the organisation Foreningen af Internetleverandører (FIL), and threatened to go directly to IANA to counter what they saw as a bona fide Tele Danmark monopoly. Tele Denmark agreed and FIL became the authority registered by IANA for the .dk domain, while the nominal and practical administration remained the responsibility of DKnet A/S. In June 1996 they signed a one-year contract about the practice and rules concerning the .dk domain, which would later be renewed for another year.

=== Race for the .dk domain ===
On January 15, 1997, at 15:00, FIL loosened the restrictions for registering a .dk domain name. Where one had previously needed a valid reason to register one, all restrictions were now removed, creating an unprecedented run on .dk domain names. By the end of 1996 there were only 6,500 registered .dk domains, by February 1, 1997, this had more than doubled and at the end of 1997 there were 41,000 registered .dk domains. This in turn created a series of legal actions, which would last well into the 2000s, not only against FIL's own members, who were accused of using inside knowledge to register large numbers of "good" domain names quickly, but also against individuals who were accused of cyber squatting.

In December 1997 Tele Danmark announced that from the beginning of 1998 they would start collecting a yearly fee (of 340 DKK excluding VAT) for every registered domain name via Punktum dk. This caused a stir in FIL's members, as they had not been informed. While there had been talks about some sort of fee to Punktum dk to cover its expenses, no review of Punktum dk's actual budget was available since it was financially all but a part of Tele Danmark. This was therefore seen by FIL as abuse of power and profit making via the supposedly non-profit Punktum dk organization. It was later revealed that it was the board of directors of FIL (later fired) that had granted Tele Danmark the right to set the price that they wanted, without asking its members.

As a consequence of this, Tele Danmark announced in March 1998 that the commercial parts in DKnet A/S would be moved to Tele Denmark Internet and DKnet A/S, with its only remaining asset, Punktum dk, would be renamed to "Punktum dk A/S", and put up for sale. Tele Danmark encouraged a larger forum or group comprising more than just telecom and internet companies (like FIL) to form and buy it, because the Internet now had a much broader appeal. This caused yet another stir in FIL who flat-out rejected that Tele Denmark had the right to sell something it did not own.

=== DIFO takes over ===
In October 1998 FIL sent a letter to Tele Danmark ending the contract and agreement that had been signed back in June 1996 (renewed in 1997). The letter also stated that FIL wanted to take over the running of Punktum dk themselves. Tele Danmark denied that FIL could do this. In November 1998 FIL, on the invitation of the Danish Ministry of Science, Technology and Innovation, called a meeting between all actors on the Danish internet, companies as well as users, under the banner "ID MoU" ("Internet Danmark Memorandum of Understanding") in order to establish a long-term agreement on the administration of the .dk domain. The result of "ID MoU" was that a number of institutions and organizations established a self-owning institution named Dansk INTERNET Forum (DIFO) on July 1, 1999, which with the help of external investment bought "Punktum dk A/S" in December 1999.

=== IPv6 ===
Punktum dk has offered IPv6 glue records for second-level domains since April 4, 2008, when the first DNS provider had IPv6 glue records added in the TLD. IPv6 was enabled at the transport layer to TLD nameservers a few years prior to that. Just days prior to the World IPv6 day, Punktum dk added an IPv6 address in DNS for their web server and that of the web server of its owner, DIFO.

=== DNSSEC ===
After the DNS root zone was signed in mid-July 2010, the .DK-zone was officially signed using NSEC3 on July 23, 2010, and the root zone was updated July 26, 2010, to include the corresponding DS-record. Since August 1, 2010, customers' DS-records have been included in the DK-zone.

== Second level domains ==
In general most companies and people register their desired domain name at the second level, e.g. company.dk and lastname.dk.

== Third level domains ==
Third level domains are allocated by second level domain owners. The registry does not run, recommend nor endorse any general second level domains, such as .com.dk, for third parties, and they are generally not seen.

== Oldest .dk domains ==
The oldest .dk domains still registered in Punktum dk's database, are the domains dkuug.dk, diku.dk, bk.dk, ibt.dk, ifad.dk, lego.dk, mainz.dk and nordita.dk which were all registered in 1987 when .dk was registered. With the registration of .dk a dual naming with both .uucp and .dk names was introduced. Of these, diku.dk and ibt.dk can be said to be the oldest names, as these were the initial names on the Danish UUCP network started 2 January 1983.

== New name ==
In April 2023, DK Hostmaster changed its name to Punktum dk.
