= OpenDocument technical specification =

Details of the open standard for office documents

This article describes the technical specifications of the OpenDocument office document standard, as developed by the OASIS industry consortium. A variety of organizations developed the standard publicly and make it publicly accessible, meaning it can be implemented by anyone without restriction. The OpenDocument format aims to provide an open alternative to proprietary document formats.

== Document representation ==
The OpenDocument format supports the following two ways of document representation:

- As a collection of several sub-documents within a package, each of which stores part of the complete document. This is the common representation of OpenDocument documents. It uses filename extensions such as .odt, .ott, .ods, .odp ... etc. The package is a standard ZIP file with different filename extensions and with a defined structure of sub-documents. Each sub-document within a package has a different document root and stores a particular aspect of the XML document. All types of documents (e.g. text and spreadsheet documents) use the same set of document and sub-document definitions.
- As a single XML document – also known as Flat XML or Uncompressed XML Files. Single OpenDocument XML files are not widely used, they are also unsupported on some office software which claims to support ODF (Microsoft Office applications version 2007 to 2013 do not recognize them). Filename extensions for a single OpenDocument XML documents are not defined in the OpenDocument technical specification, but commonly used are .xml, .fodt, .fods, ... etc.

The recommended filename extensions and MIME types are included in the official standard (OASIS, May 1, 2005, and its later revisions or versions). The MIME types and extensions contained in the ODF specification are applicable only to office documents that are contained in a package. Office documents that conform to the OpenDocument specification but are not contained in a package should use the MIME type text/xml.

The MIME type is also used in the office:mimetype attribute. It is very important to use this attribute in flat XML files/single XML documents, where this is the only way the type of the document can be detected (in a package, the MIME type is also present in a separate file mimetype). Its values are the MIME types that are used for the packaged variant of office documents.

== Documents ==
The most common file extensions used for OpenDocument documents are .odt for text documents, .ods for spreadsheets, .odp for presentation programs, and .odg for graphics. These are easily remembered by considering ".od" as being short for "OpenDocument", and then noting that the last letter indicates its more specific type (such as t for text). Here is the complete list of document types, showing the type of file, the recommended file extension, and the MIME Type:

File type	Extension	MIME Type	ODF specification
Text	.odt	application/vnd.oasis.opendocument.text	1.0
Spreadsheet	.ods	application/vnd.oasis.opendocument.spreadsheet	1.0
Presentation	.odp	application/vnd.oasis.opendocument.presentation	1.0
Drawing	.odg	application/vnd.oasis.opendocument.graphics	1.0
Chart	.odc	application/vnd.oasis.opendocument.chart	1.0
Formula	.odf	application/vnd.oasis.opendocument.formula	1.0
Image	.odi	application/vnd.oasis.opendocument.image	1.0
Master Document	.odm	application/vnd.oasis.opendocument.text-master	1.0
Database	.odb	application/vnd.sun.xml.base	not defined in ODF 1.0/1.1 specifications; used in OpenOffice.org 2.x
Database	.odb	application/vnd.oasis.opendocument.base	ODF 1.2; used in OpenOffice.org 3.x
Database	.odb	application/vnd.oasis.opendocument.database	defined in IANA registration
all OpenDocument single/flat XML files	not defined	text/xml	1.0

== Templates ==
OpenDocument also supports a set of template types. Templates represent formatting information (including styles) for documents, without the content themselves. The recommended filename extension begins with ".ot" (interpretable as short for "OpenDocument template"), with the last letter indicating what kind of template (such as "t" for text). The supported set includes:

File type	Extension	MIME Type	ODF specification
Text	.ott	application/vnd.oasis.opendocument.text-template	1.0
Spreadsheet	.ots	application/vnd.oasis.opendocument.spreadsheet-template	1.0
Presentation	.otp	application/vnd.oasis.opendocument.presentation-template	1.0
Drawing	.otg	application/vnd.oasis.opendocument.graphics-template	1.0
Chart template	.otc	application/vnd.oasis.opendocument.chart-template	1.0
Formula template	.otf	application/vnd.oasis.opendocument.formula-template	1.0
Image template	.oti	application/vnd.oasis.opendocument.image-template	1.0
Web page template	.oth	application/vnd.oasis.opendocument.text-web	1.0

== Capabilities ==
As noted above, the OpenDocument format can describe text documents (for example, those typically edited by a word processor), spreadsheets, presentations, drawings/graphics, images, charts, mathematical formulas, and "master documents" (which can combine them). It can also represent templates for many of them.

The official OpenDocument standard version 1.0 (OASIS, May 1, 2005) defines OpenDocument's capabilities. The text below provides a brief summary of the format's capabilities.

=== Metadata ===
The OpenDocument format supports storing metadata (data about the data) by having a set of pre-defined metadata elements, as well as allowing user-defined and custom metadata. The format predefines the following metadata fields:

- Generator
- Title
- Description
- Subject
- Keywords
- Initial Creator
- Creator
- Printed By
- Creation Date and Time
- Modification Date and Time
- Print Date and Time
- Document Template
- Automatic Reload
- Hyperlink Behavior
- Language
- Editing Cycles
- Editing Duration
- Document Statistics

=== Content ===
OpenDocument's text content format supports both typical and advanced capabilities. Headings of various levels, lists of various kinds (numbered and not), numbered paragraphs, and change tracking are all supported. Page sequences and section attributes can be used to control how the text is displayed. Hyperlinks, ruby text (which provides annotations and is especially critical for some languages), bookmarks, and references are supported as well. Text fields (for autogenerated content), and mechanisms for automatically generating tables such as tables of contents, indexes, and bibliographies, are included as well.

The OpenDocument format implements spreadsheets as sets of tables. Thus it features extensive capabilities for formatting the display of tables and spreadsheets. OpenDocument also supports database ranges, filters, and "data pilots" (known in Microsoft Excel contexts as "pivot tables"). Change tracking is available for spreadsheets as well.

The graphics format supports a vector graphic representation, in which a set of layers and the contents of each layer is defined. Available drawing shapes include Rectangle, Line, Polyline, Polygon, Regular Polygon, Path, Circle, Ellipse, and Connector. 3D Shapes are also available; the format includes information about the Scene, Light, Cube, Sphere, Extrude, and Rotate (it is intended for use as for office data exchange, and not sufficient to represent videos or other extensive 3D scenes). Custom shapes can also be defined.

Presentations are supported. Users can include animations in presentations, with control over the sound, showing a shape or text, hiding a shape or text, or dimming something, and these can be grouped. In OpenDocument, much of the format capabilities are reused from the text format, simplifying implementations. However, tables are not supported within OpenDocument as drawing objects, so may only be included in presentations as embedded tables.

Charts define how to create graphical displays from numerical data. They support titles, subtitles, a footer, and a legend to explain the chart. The format defines the series of data that is to be used for the graphical display, and a number of different kinds of graphical displays (such as line charts, pie charts, and so on).

Forms are specially supported, building on the existing XForms standard.

==== Objects ====
A document in OpenDocument format can contain two types of objects, as follows:

- Objects that have an OpenDocument representation. These objects are:
  - Formulas (represented as MathML)
  - Charts
  - Spreadsheets
  - Text documents
  - Drawings
  - Presentations
- Objects that do not have an XML representation and only have a binary representation. Examples for these kinds of objects are raster images, recorded audios and videos, and OLE objects.

Use of Microsoft Object Linking and Embedding (OLE) objects limits the interoperability, because these objects are not widely supported in programs for viewing or editing files (e.g. embedding of other files inside the file, such as tables or charts from a spreadsheet application in a text document or presentation file). If software that understands an OLE object is not available, the object is usually replaced by a picture (bitmap representation of the object) or not displayed at all.

=== Formatting ===
The style and formatting controls are numerous, providing a number of controls over the display of information.

Page layout is controlled by a variety of attributes. These include page size, number format, paper tray, print orientation, margins, border (and its line width), padding, shadow, background, columns, print page order, first page number, scale, table centering, maximum footnote height and separator, and many layout grid properties.

Headers and footer can have defined fixed and minimum heights, margins, border line width, padding, background, shadow, and dynamic spacing.

There are many attributes for specific text, paragraphs, ruby text, sections, tables, columns, lists, and fills. Specific characters can have their fonts, sizes, generic font family names (roman – serif, swiss – sans-serif, modern – monospace, decorative, script or system), and other properties set. Paragraphs can have their vertical space controlled through attributes on keep together, widow, and orphan, and have other attributes such as "drop caps" to provide special formatting. The list is extremely extensive; see the references (in particular the actual standard) for details.

=== Spreadsheet formulas ===
OpenDocument version 1.2 fully describes mathematical formulas displayable on-screen. It is fully capable of exchanging spreadsheet data, formats, pivot tables, and other information typically included in a spreadsheet. OpenDocument exchanges formulas as values of the attribute table:formula.

The allowed syntax of table:formula was not defined in sufficient detail in the OpenDocument version 1.0 specification, which defined spreadsheet formulas using a set of simple examples showing, for example, how to specify ranges and the SUM() function. The OASIS OpenDocument Formula sub group therefore standardized the table:formula in the OpenFormula specification. For more information see the OpenFormula article.

=== Encryption ===
When an OpenDocument file is password protected the file structure of the bundle remains the same, but contents of XML files in the package are encrypted using the following algorithm:

1. The file contents are compressed with the DEFLATE algorithm.
2. A checksum of a portion of the compressed file is computed (SHA-1 of the file contents, or SHA-1 of the first 1024 bytes of the file, or SHA-256 of the first 1024 bytes of the file) and stored, so password correctness can be verified when decrypting.
3. A digest (hash) of the user-entered password in UTF-8 encoding is created and passed to the package component. ODF versions 1.0 and 1.1 only mandate support for the SHA-1 digest here, while version 1.2 recommends SHA-256.
4. This digest is used to produce a derived key by undergoing key stretching with PBKDF2 using HMAC-SHA-1 with a salt of arbitrary length (in ODF 1.2; it's 16 bytes in ODF 1.1 and below) generated by the random number generator for an arbitrary iteration count (1024 by default in ODF 1.2).
5. The random number generator is used to generate a random initialization vector for each file.
6. The initialization vector and derived key are used to encrypt the compressed file contents. ODF 1.0 and 1.1 use Blowfish in 8-bit cipher feedback mode, while ODF 1.2 considers it a legacy algorithm and allows Triple DES and AES (with 128, 196 or 256 bits), both in cipher block chaining mode, to be used instead.

== Format internals ==
An OpenDocument file commonly consists of a standard ZIP archive (JAR archive) containing a number of files and directories; but OpenDocument file can also consist only of a single XML document. An OpenDocument file is commonly a collection of several subdocuments within a (ZIP) package. An OpenDocument file as a single XML is not widely used. According to the OpenDocument 1.0 specification, the ZIP file specification is defined in Info-ZIP Application Note 970311, 1997. The simple compression mechanism used for a package normally makes OpenDocument files significantly smaller than equivalent Microsoft ".doc" or ".ppt" files. This smaller size is important for organizations who store a vast number of documents for long periods of time, and to those organizations who must exchange documents over low bandwidth connections. Once uncompressed, most data is contained in simple text-based XML files, so the uncompressed data contents have the typical ease of modification and processing of XML files. The standard also allows for the creation of a single XML document, which uses <office:document> as the root element, for use in document processing.

The standard allows the inclusion of directories to store images, non-SMIL animations, and other files that are used by the document but cannot be expressed directly in the XML.

Due to the openly specified compression format used, it is possible for a user to extract the container file to manually edit the contained files. This allows repair of a corrupted file or low-level manipulation of the contents.

The zipped set of files and directories includes the following:

- XML files
  - content.xml
  - meta.xml
  - settings.xml
  - styles.xml
- Other files
  - mimetype
- Directories
  - META-INF/
    - manifest.xml
  - Thumbnails/
    - thumbnail.png

The OpenDocument format provides a strong separation between content, layout and metadata. The most notable components of the format are described in the subsections below. The files in XML format are further defined using the RELAX NG language for defining XML schemas. RELAX NG is itself defined by an OASIS specification, as well as by part two of the international standard ISO/IEC 19757: Document Schema Definition Languages (DSDL).

=== content.xml ===
content.xml, the most important file, carries the actual content of the document (except for binary data, such as images). The base format is inspired by HTML, and though far more complex, it should be reasonably legible to humans:

<text:h style-name="Heading_2">This is a title</text:h>
<text:p style-name="Text_body"/>
<text:p style-name="Text_body">
   This is a paragraph. The formatting information is
   in the Text_body style. The empty text:p tag above
   is a blank paragraph (an empty line).
</text:p>

=== styles.xml ===
styles.xml contains style information. OpenDocument makes heavy use of styles for formatting and layout. Most of the style information is here (though some is in content.xml). Styles types include:

- Paragraph styles
- Page styles
- Character styles
- Frame styles
- List styles

The OpenDocument format is somewhat unusual in that using styles for formatting cannot be avoided. Even "manual" formatting is implemented through styles (the application dynamically makes new styles as needed).

=== meta.xml ===
meta.xml contains the file metadata. For example, Author, "Last modified by", date of last modification, etc. The contents look somewhat like this:

<meta:creation-date>2003-09-10T15:31:11</meta:creation-date>
<dc:creator>Daniel Carrera</dc:creator>
<dc:date>2005-06-29T22:02:06</dc:date>
<dc:language>es-ES</dc:language>
<meta:document-statistic
      table-count="6" object-count="0"
      page-count="59" paragraph-count="676"
      image-count="2" word-count="16701"
      character-count="98757"/>

The names of the <dc:...> tags come from the Dublin Core XML standard.

=== settings.xml ===
settings.xml includes settings such as the zoom factor or the cursor position. These are properties that are not content or layout.

=== mimetype (file) ===
mimetype is just a one-line file with the mimetype of the document. One implication of this is that the file extension is actually immaterial to the format. The file extension is only there for the benefit of the user. This special file is always the first file entry in the ZIP archive, and it is uncompressed. Because the ZIP header uses fields with fixed lengths, this allows the direct identification of the different OpenDocument formats without decompression of the content (e. g. with magic bytes).

=== Thumbnails (directory) ===
Thumbnails is a separate folder for a document thumbnail. The thumbnail must be saved as “thumbnail.png”. A thumbnail representation of a document should be generated by default when the file is saved. It should be a representation of the first page, first sheet, etc. of the document. The required size for the thumbnails is 128x128 pixel. In order to conform to the Thumbnail Managing Standard (TMS) at www.freedesktop.org, thumbnails must be saved as 8bit, non-interlaced PNG image with full alpha transparency.

=== META-INF (directory) ===
META-INF is a separate folder. Information about the files contained in the OpenDocument package is stored in an XML file called the manifest file. The manifest file is always stored at the pathname META-INF/manifest.xml. The main pieces of information stored in the manifest are:

- A list of all of the files in the package.
- The media type of each file in the package.
- If a file stored in the package is encrypted, the information required to decrypt the file is stored in the manifest.

=== Pictures (directory) ===
Pictures is a separate folder for images included in the document. This folder is not defined in the OpenDocument specification. Files in this folder can use various image formats, depending on the format of inserted file. While the image data may have an arbitrary format, it is recommended that bitmap graphics are stored in the PNG format and vector graphics in the SVG format.

=== Reuse of existing formats ===
By design, OpenDocument reuses existing open XML standards whenever they are available, and it creates new tags only where no existing standard can provide the needed functionality. Thus OpenDocument uses a subset of DublinCore for metadata, MathML for displayed formulas, SMIL for multimedia, XLink for hyperlinks etc.

Although not fully reusing SVG for vector graphics, OpenDocument does use SVG-compatible vector graphics within an ODF-format-specific namespace, but also includes non-SVG graphics.

== History ==
- Version 1.0 became an OASIS Standard on 2005-05-01;
- Version 1.1 became an OASIS Standard on 2007-02-07;
- Version 1.2 became an OASIS Standard on 2011-09-29;
- Version 1.3 became an OASIS Standard on 2021-04-27.

== Versions detection ==
To indicate which version of the OpenDocument specification a file complies with, all root elements take an office:version attribute (in the format revision.version, such as office:version="1.1"), which identifies the version of ODF specification that defined the associated element, its schema, its complete content, and its interpretation.

=== ODF 1.0/1.1 ===
It is not mandatory to use office:version attribute in ODF 1.0 and ODF 1.1 files, so when an element has office:version omitted, the element is based on ODF 1.0 or 1.1. If the file has a version known to an XML processor, it may validate the document. Otherwise, it is optional to validate the document, but the document must be well formed.

=== ODF 1.2 and newer ===
The office:version attribute shall be present in each and every <office:document>, <office:document-content>, <office:document-styles>, <office:document-meta>, and <office:document-settings> element in the XML documents that comprise an OpenDocument 1.2 or newer document. The value of the office:version attribute shall reflect the OpenDocument version.

== Conformance ==
=== ODF 1.0/1.1 ===
The OpenDocument specification does not specify which elements and attributes conforming applications must, should, or may support. Even typical office applications may only support a subset of the elements and attributes defined in the specification. The specification contains a non-normative table that provides an overview which element and attributes usually are supported by typical office application.

Documents that conform to the OpenDocument specification may contain elements and attributes not specified within the OpenDocument schema. Such elements and attributes must not be part of a namespace that is defined within the specification and are called foreign elements and attributes.

Conforming applications either shall read documents that are valid against the OpenDocument schema if all foreign elements and attributes are removed before validation takes place, or shall write documents that are valid against the OpenDocument schema if all foreign elements and attributes are removed before validation takes place. Conforming applications that read and write documents may preserve foreign elements and attributes. In addition to this, conforming applications should preserve meta information and the content of styles.

Conforming applications shall read documents containing processing instructions and should preserve them.

=== ODF 1.2 ===
ODF 1.2 defines precisely the conformance needs. The specification defines conformance for documents, consumers, and producers, with two conformance classes called conforming and extended conforming. It further defines conforming text, spreadsheet, drawing, presentation, chart, image, formula and database front end documents. Chapter 2 defines the basic requirements for the individual conformance targets.
