= OpenDocument Format Alliance =

The Open Document Format Alliance (ODF Alliance) was a Washington, D.C.–based lobbying organization established by IBM, Sun Microsystems and SIIA to "promote and advance the use of OpenDocument Format (ODF) as the primary document format for governments" Although originally focused on promotion of ODF "via legislation or by executive policy decision", the ODF Alliance also did extensive PR and lobbying in opposition to the Microsoft-backed Office Open XML standard.

Founded by IBM, Sun and 33 other companies and organizations on March 3, 2006, the Alliance has more than 500 members. However, funding sources are not itemized in the organization's 2007 annual report, so membership financial participation is unclear.

The ODF Alliance does not give a physical location on their website, but from documents filed with the State of New York, the organization appears to be headquartered on the 6th floor of 1090 Vermont Avenue NW in Washington, DC 20005, sharing offices with the Software and Information Industry Association (SIIA), one of the original backers of the ODF Alliance.

== Staff ==
The executive director is Marino Marcich, who served for four years in the Bush administration's State Department prior to joining the ODF Alliance. While at the Department of State, he was part of former Secretary of State Colin Powell's inner circle. Prior to joining the Bush administration, "Marcich also served as the National Association of Manufacturers (NAM) assistant vice president for international economic affairs, leading key lobby campaigns for World Trade Organization accession and trade-promotion authority."

Public Relations for the ODF Alliance are handled by Rational PR, headed by Kathyrn Brownlee. Although Rational PR does not list the ODF Alliance as a client as of April 2008, SIIA is listed.

== Structure ==
The ODF Alliance website provides no information on funding or management structure. At this time, the website lists 6 "national chapters" outside of the United States; Brazil, Europe, India, Malaysia, Poland and Portugal, but it is unclear if those chapter organizations have any input into the policy decisions of the organization.

== Activities ==
ODF Preferences
The ODF Alliance has also been very active in lobbying U.S. State and International governments on ODF issues to promote legislative mandates for the use of the ODF document format. The ODF Alliance has provided public testimony in the following fora:

- 2008 April 9: Testimony before the Government Reform Committee, State of Texas;
- 2007 February 7: Newsletter to ODF Alliance Members;
- 2007 April 17: AB 1668 California Assembly Bill: Bill Analysis.

Anti-OOXML
During late 2007 though 2008, the ODF Alliance was focused on lobbying ISO members in order to prevent OOXML from being accepted by ISO.

- Ongoing: OOXML Updates and Analysis;
- 2007 June 7: "ODF Alliance posts documents about OOXML/OpenXML/whatever";
- 2008 February 25: Open Forum Europe Geneva Conference.

Last known Newsletter
The ODF Alliance website's last snapshot saved by Archive.org dates back from March 24, 2013. Even then, the latest published news was the "ODFA Newsletter" from October 2010, implying the Alliance ceased to operate long before the website was shut down. During 2014 the domain name odfalliance.org went from displaying error pages to briefly displaying ODF-related news, and to finally housing legal information about injury lawyers. In 2015 odfalliance.org housed cigar news. No news could be found about exactly when or why the ODFA was dissolved.
