= Danish UNIX User Group =

Computer user group focused on UNIX

The Danish UNIX systems User Group (Danish: Dansk UNIX-system Bruger Gruppe, DKUUG) is a computer user group focused around UNIX. It was the first Internet provider in Denmark and also created and maintained the .dk internet domain for the country.

Founded 18 November 1983, DKUUG is a primary advisor on the Danish UNIX and Open Standards use. The group is active in the standards processes for UNIX, POSIX, the Internet, the World Wide Web, and Open Document Format.

== History ==
The Danish UNIX User Group was founded on 18 November 1983 with the purpose of promoting UNIX and providing Internet access to the Danish academic community and the whole of Denmark. An offshoot of the EUUG, the DKUUG membership was originally 41 people from the Danish academic and business computing industry. Founder Keld Simonsen of the Datalogisk Institut at Copenhagen University served as group foreman from 1983 to 1997. It formed a commercial subsidiary, DKnet, organized as the Danish affiliate of the EUnet network.

In 1996, DKnet was purchased by the Danish PTT TeleDanmark in a private transaction for 20 million DKK.

During the 2000s, the organization has been the subject of internal disagreement and infighting among board members.

== See also ==
- .dk
