= Information Technology Task Force =

- Abbreviation: ITTF
- Type: Standards organization
- Purpose: Administration to support the work of ISO/IEC JTC 1
- Headquarters: Geneva, Switzerland
- Region served: Worldwide
- Website: http://www.iso.org/ittf

The ISO/IEC Information Technology Task Force (ITTF) is a body jointly formed by ISO and IEC responsible for the planning and coordination of the work of JTC 1. It has several responsibilities described in the JTC 1 Directives clause 4.1 including:

- day-to-day planning and coordination of the technical work
- supervising the application of rules
- advising JTC 1 on points of procedure
- administration of ballots
- publishing activities, including the printing, distribution and sale of International Standards

== Publishing activities ==
The ITTF makes a number of International Standards and associated material available for free-of-charge download “for standardization purposes” Some well-known texts so available include:

- ISO/IEC 10646 Universal Multiple-Octet Coded Character Set (UCS)
- ISO/IEC 14977 Syntactic metalanguage — Extended BNF
- ISO/IEC 19757-2 Regular-grammar-based validation — RELAX NG
- ISO/IEC 26300 Open Document Format for Office Applications (OpenDocument) v1.0
- ISO/IEC 29500 Office Open XML File Formats
