= Microsoft Office XML formats =

File format family introduced at Microsoft Office XP and Microsoft Office 2003

WordProcessingML
- Filename extension: .XML (XML document)
- Developed by: Microsoft
- Type of format: Document file format
- Extended from: XML, DOC

DataDiagramingML
- Filename extension: .VDX (XML Drawing),.VSX (XML Stencil),.VTX (XML Template)
- Developed by: Microsoft
- Type of format: Diagramming vector graphics
- Extended from: XML, VSD, VSS, VST

SpreadsheetML
- Filename extension: .XML (XML Spreadsheet)
- Developed by: Microsoft
- Type of format: Spreadsheet
- Extended from: XML, XLS

The Microsoft Office XML formats are XML-based document formats (or XML schemas) introduced in versions of Microsoft Office prior to Office 2007. Microsoft Office XP introduced a new XML format for storing Excel spreadsheets and Office 2003 added an XML-based format for Word documents.

These formats were succeeded by Office Open XML (ECMA-376) in Microsoft Office 2007.

== File formats ==
- Microsoft Office Word 2003 XML Format — WordProcessingML or WordML (.XML)
- Microsoft Office Excel 2002 and Excel 2003 XML Format — SpreadsheetML (.XML)
- Microsoft Office Visio 2003 XML Format — DataDiagramingML (.VDX, .VSX, .VTX)
- Microsoft Office InfoPath 2003 XML Format — XML FormTemplate (.XSN) (Compressed XML templates in a Cabinet file)
- Microsoft Office InfoPath 2003 XML Format — XMLS FormTemplate (.XSN) (Compressed XML templates in a Cabinet file)

== Limitations and differences with Office Open XML ==
Besides differences in the schema, there are several other differences between the earlier Office XML schema formats and Office Open XML.

- Whereas the data in Office Open XML documents is stored in multiple parts and compressed in a ZIP file conforming to the Open Packaging Conventions, Microsoft Office XML formats are stored as plain single monolithic XML files (making them quite large, compared to OOXML and the Microsoft Office legacy binary formats). Also, embedded items like pictures are stored as binary encoded blocks within the XML. In the case of Office Open XML, the header, footer, comments of a document etc. are all stored separately.
- XML Spreadsheet documents cannot store Visual Basic for Applications macros, auditing tracer arrows, charts and other graphic objects, custom views, drawing object layers, outlining, scenarios, shared workbook information and user-defined function categories. In contrast, the newer Office Open XML formats support full document fidelity.
- Poor backward compatibility with the version of Word/Excel prior to the one in which they were introduced. For example, Word 2002 cannot open Word 2003 XML files unless a third-party converter add-in is installed. Microsoft has released a Word 2003 XML Viewer which allows WordProcessingML files saved by Word 2003 to be viewed as HTML from within Internet Explorer. For Office Open XML, Microsoft provides converters for Office 2003, Office XP and Office 2000.
- Office Open XML formats are also defined for PowerPoint 2007, equation editing (Office MathML), vector drawing, charts and text art (DrawingML).

== Word XML format example ==
<?xml version="1.0" encoding="utf-8" standalone="yes"?>
<?mso-application progid="Word.Document"?>
<w:wordDocument
   xmlns:w="http://schemas.microsoft.com/office/word/2003/wordml"
   xmlns:wx="http://schemas.microsoft.com/office/word/2003/auxHint"
   xmlns:o="urn:schemas-microsoft-com:office:office"
   w:macrosPresent="no"
   w:embeddedObjPresent="no"
   w:ocxPresent="no"
   xml:space="preserve">
  <o:DocumentProperties>
    <o:Title>This is the title</o:Title>
    <o:Author>Darl McBride</o:Author>
    <o:LastAuthor>Bill Gates</o:LastAuthor>
    <o:Revision>1</o:Revision>
    <o:TotalTime>0</o:TotalTime>
    <o:Created>2007-03-15T23:05:00Z</o:Created>
    <o:LastSaved>2007-03-15T23:05:00Z</o:LastSaved>
    <o:Pages>1</o:Pages>
    <o:Words>6</o:Words>
    <o:Characters>40</o:Characters>
    <o:Company>SCO Group, Inc.</o:Company>
    <o:Lines>1</o:Lines>
    <o:Paragraphs>1</o:Paragraphs>
    <o:CharactersWithSpaces>45</o:CharactersWithSpaces>
    <o:Version>11.6359</o:Version>
  </o:DocumentProperties>
  <w:fonts>
    <w:defaultFonts
       w:ascii="Times New Roman"
       w:fareast="Times New Roman"
       w:h-ansi="Times New Roman"
       w:cs="Times New Roman" />
  </w:fonts>

  <w:styles>
    <w:versionOfBuiltInStylenames w:val="4" />
    <w:latentStyles w:defLockedState="off" w:latentStyleCount="156" />
    <w:style w:type="paragraph" w:default="on" w:styleId="Normal">
      <w:name w:val="Normal" />
      <w:rPr>
        <wx:font wx:val="Times New Roman" />
        <w:sz w:val="24" />
        <w:sz-cs w:val="24" />
        <w:lang w:val="EN-US" w:fareast="EN-US" w:bidi="AR-SA" />
      </w:rPr>
    </w:style>
    <w:style w:type="paragraph" w:styleId="Heading1">
      <w:name w:val="heading 1" />
      <wx:uiName wx:val="Heading 1" />
      <w:basedOn w:val="Normal" />
      <w:next w:val="Normal" />
      <w:rsid w:val="00D93B94" />
      <w:pPr>
        <w:pStyle w:val="Heading1" />
        <w:keepNext />
        <w:spacing w:before="240" w:after="60" />
        <w:outlineLvl w:val="0" />
      </w:pPr>
      <w:rPr>
        <w:rFonts w:ascii="Arial" w:h-ansi="Arial" w:cs="Arial" />
        <wx:font wx:val="Arial" />
        <w:b />
        <w:b-cs />
        <w:kern w:val="32" />
        <w:sz w:val="32" />
        <w:sz-cs w:val="32" />
      </w:rPr>
    </w:style>
    <w:style w:type="character" w:default="on" w:styleId="DefaultParagraphFont">
      <w:name w:val="Default Paragraph Font" />
      <w:semiHidden />
    </w:style>
    <w:style w:type="table" w:default="on" w:styleId="TableNormal">
      <w:name w:val="Normal Table" />
      <wx:uiName wx:val="Table Normal" />
      <w:semiHidden />
      <w:rPr>
        <wx:font wx:val="Times New Roman" />
      </w:rPr>
      <w:tblPr>
        <w:tblInd w:w="0" w:type="dxa" />
        <w:tblCellMar>
          <w:top w:w="0" w:type="dxa" />
          <w:left w:w="108" w:type="dxa" />
          <w:bottom w:w="0" w:type="dxa" />
          <w:right w:w="108" w:type="dxa" />
        </w:tblCellMar>
      </w:tblPr>
    </w:style>
    <w:style w:type="list" w:default="on" w:styleId="NoList">
      <w:name w:val="No List" />
      <w:semiHidden />
    </w:style>
  </w:styles>
  <w:docPr>
    <w:view w:val="print" />
    <w:zoom w:percent="100" />
    <w:doNotEmbedSystemFonts />
    <w:proofState w:spelling="clean" w:grammar="clean" />
    <w:attachedTemplate w:val="" />
    <w:defaultTabStop w:val="720" />
    <w:punctuationKerning />
    <w:characterSpacingControl w:val="DontCompress" />
    <w:optimizeForBrowser />
    <w:validateAgainstSchema />
    <w:saveInvalidXML w:val="off" />
    <w:ignoreMixedContent w:val="off" />
    <w:alwaysShowPlaceholderText w:val="off" />
    <w:compat>
      <w:breakWrappedTables />
      <w:snapToGridInCell />
      <w:wrapTextWithPunct />
      <w:useAsianBreakRules />
      <w:dontGrowAutofit />
    </w:compat>
  </w:docPr>
  <w:body>
    <wx:sect>
      <w:p>
        <w:r>
          <w:t>This is the first paragraph</w:t>
        </w:r>
      </w:p>
      <wx:sub-section>
        <w:p>
          <w:pPr>
            <w:pStyle w:val="Heading1" />
          </w:pPr>
          <w:r>
            <w:t>This is a heading</w:t>
          </w:r>
        </w:p>
        <w:sectPr>
          <w:pgSz w:w="12240" w:h="15840" />
          <w:pgMar w:top="1440"
		   w:right="1800"
		   w:bottom="1440"
		   w:left="1800"
		   w:header="720"
		   w:footer="720"
		   w:gutter="0" />
          <w:cols w:space="720" />
          <w:docGrid w:line-pitch="360" />
        </w:sectPr>
      </wx:sub-section>
    </wx:sect>
  </w:body>
</w:wordDocument>

== Excel XML spreadsheet example ==
<?xml version="1.0" encoding="UTF-8"?>
<?mso-application progid="Excel.Sheet"?>
<Workbook xmlns="urn:schemas-microsoft-com:office:spreadsheet" xmlns:x="urn:schemas-microsoft-com:office:excel" xmlns:ss="urn:schemas-microsoft-com:office:spreadsheet" xmlns:html="https://www.w3.org/TR/html401/">
<Worksheet ss:Name="CognaLearn+Intedashboard">
<Table>
<Column ss:Index="1" ss:AutoFitWidth="0" ss:Width="110"/>
<Row>
<Cell><Data ss:Type="String">ID</Data></Cell>
<Cell><Data ss:Type="String">Project</Data></Cell>
<Cell><Data ss:Type="String">Reporter</Data></Cell>
<Cell><Data ss:Type="String">Assigned To</Data></Cell>
<Cell><Data ss:Type="String">Priority</Data></Cell>
<Cell><Data ss:Type="String">Severity</Data></Cell>
<Cell><Data ss:Type="String">Reproducibility</Data></Cell>
<Cell><Data ss:Type="String">Product Version</Data></Cell>
<Cell><Data ss:Type="String">Category</Data></Cell>
<Cell><Data ss:Type="String">Date Submitted</Data></Cell>
<Cell><Data ss:Type="String">OS</Data></Cell>
<Cell><Data ss:Type="String">OS Version</Data></Cell>
<Cell><Data ss:Type="String">Platform</Data></Cell>
<Cell><Data ss:Type="String">View Status</Data></Cell>
<Cell><Data ss:Type="String">Updated</Data></Cell>
<Cell><Data ss:Type="String">Summary</Data></Cell>
<Cell><Data ss:Type="String">Status</Data></Cell>
<Cell><Data ss:Type="String">Resolution</Data></Cell>
<Cell><Data ss:Type="String">Fixed in Version</Data></Cell>
</Row>
<Row>
<Cell><Data ss:Type="Number">0000033</Data></Cell>
<Cell><Data ss:Type="String">CognaLearn Intedashboard</Data></Cell>
<Cell><Data ss:Type="String">janardhana.l</Data></Cell>
<Cell><Data ss:Type="String"></Data></Cell>
<Cell><Data ss:Type="String">normal</Data></Cell>
<Cell><Data ss:Type="String">text</Data></Cell>
<Cell><Data ss:Type="String">always</Data></Cell>
<Cell><Data ss:Type="String"></Data></Cell>
<Cell><Data ss:Type="String">GUI</Data></Cell>
<Cell><Data ss:Type="String">2016-10-14</Data></Cell>
<Cell><Data ss:Type="String"></Data></Cell>
<Cell><Data ss:Type="String"></Data></Cell>
<Cell><Data ss:Type="String"></Data></Cell>
<Cell><Data ss:Type="String">public</Data></Cell>
<Cell><Data ss:Type="String">2016-10-14</Data></Cell>
<Cell><Data ss:Type="String">IE8 browser_Modules screen tool tip text is shown twice</Data></Cell>
<Cell><Data ss:Type="String">new</Data></Cell>
<Cell><Data ss:Type="String">open</Data></Cell>
<Cell><Data ss:Type="String"></Data></Cell>
</Row>
</Table>
</Worksheet>
</Workbook>

== See also ==
- List of document markup languages
- Comparison of document markup languages
