= OpenDocument =

XML-based open file format for office applications

OpenDocument Text
- OpenDocument Text icon
- Filename extensions.odt .fodt
- Internet media type application/vnd.oasis. opendocument.text
- Uniform Type Identifier (UTI) org.oasis-open.opendocument.text
- UTI conformation org.oasis-open.opendocument public.composite-content
- Developed by: OASIS
- Initial release: 1 May 2005; 21 years ago
- Latest release: 1.4
- Type of format: Document
- Extended from: XML
- Standard: ISO/IEC 26300 (OASIS OpenDocument Format)
- Open format?: Yes
- Website: OASIS, ISO/IEC

OpenDocument Presentation
- OpenDocument Presentation icon
- Filename extensions.odp .fodp
- Internet media type application/vnd.oasis. opendocument.presentation
- Uniform Type Identifier (UTI) org.oasis-open.opendocument.presentation
- UTI conformation org.oasis-open.opendocument public.composite-content
- Developed by: OASIS
- Initial release: 1 May 2005; 21 years ago
- Latest release: 1.4 (27 April 2021; 5 years ago)
- Type of format: Presentation
- Extended from: XML
- Standard: ISO/IEC 26300 (OASIS OpenDocument Format)
- Open format?: Yes

OpenDocument Spreadsheet
- OpenDocument Spreadsheet icon
- Filename extensions.ods .fods
- Internet media type application/vnd.oasis. opendocument.spreadsheet
- Uniform Type Identifier (UTI) org.oasis-open.opendocument.spreadsheet
- UTI conformation org.oasis-open.opendocument public.composite-content
- Developed by: OASIS
- Initial release: 1 May 2005; 21 years ago
- Latest release: 1.3 (27 April 2021; 5 years ago)
- Type of format: Spreadsheet
- Extended from: XML
- Standard: ISO/IEC 26300 (OASIS OpenDocument Format)
- Open format?: Yes

OpenDocument Graphics
- OpenDocument Drawing icon
- Filename extensions.odg .fodg
- Internet media type application/vnd.oasis. opendocument.graphics
- Uniform Type Identifier (UTI) org.oasis-open.opendocument.graphics
- UTI conformation org.oasis-open.opendocument public.composite-content
- Developed by: OASIS
- Initial release: 1 May 2005; 21 years ago
- Latest release: 1.3 (3 December 2025; 11 months ago)
- Type of format: Graphics
- Extended from: XML
- Standard: ISO/IEC 26300 (OASIS OpenDocument Format)
- Open format?: Yes

OpenDocument Format (ODF) for Office Applications, also known as OpenDocument, standardized as ISO 26300, is an open file format for word processing documents, spreadsheets, presentations and graphics using ZIP-compressed XML files. It was developed with the aim of providing an open, XML-based file format specification for office applications.

The standard is developed and maintained by a technical committee in the Organization for the Advancement of Structured Information Standards (OASIS) consortium. It was based on the Sun Microsystems specification for OpenOffice.org XML, and is the default format for OpenOffice.org and LibreOffice. It was originally developed for StarOffice "to provide an open standard for office documents."

In addition to being an OASIS standard, it is published as an ISO/IEC international standard ISO/IEC 26300 – Open Document Format for Office Applications (OpenDocument). From March 2024, the current version is 1.4.

Since March 2026 the German government mandates the ODF and PDF/UA file formats for documents for all levels of government through the Deutschland-Stack project. Implementation is intended to be finalized by 2027.

== Specifications ==
The most common filename extensions used for OpenDocument documents are:

- .odt and .fodt for word processing (text) documents
- .ods and .fods for spreadsheets
- .odp and .fodp for presentations
- .odg and .fodg for graphics
- .odf for formulae, mathematical equations

The original OpenDocument format consists of an XML document that has <document> as its root element. OpenDocument files can also take the format of a ZIP compressed archive containing a number of files and directories; these can contain binary content and benefit from ZIP's lossless compression to reduce file size. OpenDocument benefits from separation of concerns by separating the content, styles, metadata, and application settings into four separate XML files.

There is a comprehensive set of example documents in OpenDocument format available. The whole test suite is available under the Creative Commons Attribution 2.5 license.

== History ==
=== Conception ===
The OpenDocument standard was developed by a Technical Committee (TC) under the Organization for the Advancement of Structured Information Standards (OASIS) industry consortium. The ODF-TC has members from a diverse set of companies and individuals. Active TC members have voting rights. Members associated with Sun and IBM have sometimes had a large voting influence. The standardization process involved the developers of many office suites or related document systems.

The first official ODF-TC meeting to discuss the standard was 16 December 2002. OASIS approved OpenDocument as an OASIS standard on 1 May 2005. OASIS submitted the ODF specification to ISO/IEC Joint Technical Committee 1 (JTC 1) on 16 November 2005, under Publicly Available Specification (PAS) rules. ISO/IEC standardization for an open document standard including text, spreadsheet and presentation was proposed for the first time in DKUUG 28 August 2001.

After a six-month review period, on 3 May 2006, OpenDocument unanimously passed its six-month DIS (Draft International Standard) ballot in JTC 1 (ISO/IEC JTC 1/SC 34), with broad participation, after which the OpenDocument specification was "approved for release as an ISO and IEC International Standard" under the name ISO/IEC 26300:2006.

After responding to all written ballot comments, and a 30-day default ballot, the OpenDocument international standard went to publication in ISO, officially published 30 November 2006.

In 2006, Garry Edwards, a member of OASIS TC since 2002, along with Sam Hiser and Paul "Marbux" E. Merrell founded the OpenDocument Foundation. The aim of this project was to be an open-source representative of the format in OASIS. The immediate aim of this project was to develop software that would convert legacy Microsoft Office documents to ODF. By October 2007 the project was a failure: Conversion of Microsoft Office documents could not be achieved. By this time, The foundation was convinced that ODF was not moving in a direction that they supported. As a result, it announced the decision to abandon its namesake format in favor of W3C's Compound Document Format (CDF), which was in early stages of its development. The foundation, however, never acted on this decision and was soon dissolved. The CDF was never designed for this purpose either.

=== Further standardization ===
Further standardization work with OpenDocument includes:

- The OASIS Committee Specification OpenDocument 1.0 (second edition) corresponds to the published ISO/IEC 26300:2006 standard. The content of ISO/IEC 26300 and OASIS OpenDocument v1.0 2nd ed. is identical. It includes the editorial changes made to address JTC1 ballot comments. It is available in ODF, HTML and PDF formats.
- OpenDocument 1.1 includes additional features to address accessibility concerns. It was approved as an OASIS Standard on 2007-02-01 following a call for vote issued on 2007-01-16. The public announcement was made on 2007-02-13. This version was not initially submitted to ISO/IEC, because it is considered to be a minor update to ODF 1.0 only, and OASIS were working already on ODF 1.2 at the time ODF 1.1 was approved. However it was later submitted to ISO/IEC and published in March 2012 as "ISO/IEC 26300:2006/Amd 1:2012 – Open Document Format for Office Applications (OpenDocument) v1.1".
- OpenDocument 1.2 includes additional accessibility features, RDF-based metadata, a spreadsheet formula specification based on OpenFormula, support for digital signatures and some features suggested by the public. It consists of three parts: Part 1: OpenDocument Schema, Part 2: Recalculated Formula (OpenFormula) Format and Part 3: Packages. Version 1.2 of the specification was approved as an OASIS Standard on 29 September 2011. It was submitted to the relevant ISO committee under the Publicly Available Specification (PAS) procedure in March 2014. In October 2014, it was unanimously approved as a Draft International Standard. Some comments were raised in the process that needed to be addressed before OpenDocument 1.2 could proceed to become an International Standard. OpenDocument 1.2 was published as ISO/IEC standard on 17 June 2015.
- OpenDocument 1.3 includes additional features for digital signatures, encryption, change-tracking and inter-operability. Version 1.3 of the OpenDocument specification was approved as an OASIS Standard April 2021. The specification was completed as the result of the COSM crowdfunding project seeded by The Document Foundation.
- OpenDocument 1.4 was approved as an OASIS Open standard on 2025-12-03. The specification can be found on the Oasis Open site.

== Application support ==
=== Software ===
The OpenDocument format is used in free software and in proprietary software. This includes office suites (both stand-alone and web-based) and individual applications such as word-processors, spreadsheets, presentation, and data management applications. Prominent text editors, word processors and office suites supporting OpenDocument fully or partially include:

- AbiWord
- Adobe Buzzword
- Apache OpenOffice supports ODF 1.2
- Bean
- Calibre ebook viewer, converter, editor, and manager
- Calligra Suite
- Collabora Office and Collabora Online
- Corel WordPerfect Office X6
- Dropbox
- Evince
- Gnumeric
- Google Docs
- IBM Lotus Symphony
- Inkscape exports .odg
- KOffice
- LibreOffice (≥ v25.2 supports ODF 1.4)
- Microsoft Office 2003 and Office XP (with the Open Source OpenXML/ODF Translator Add-in for Office)
- Microsoft Office 2007 (with Service Pack 2 or 3) supports ODF 1.1 (Windows only)
- Microsoft Office 2010 supports ODF 1.1 (Windows only)
- Microsoft Office 2013 supports ODF 1.2 (Windows only)
- Microsoft Office 2016 and 2019 support ODF 1.2 (Windows: read/write; OS X: read-only after online conversion)
- Microsoft Office 2021 supports ODF 1.3 (Windows and macOS)
- Microsoft Office 2024 supports ODF 1.4 (Windows and macOS)
- Microsoft 365 supports ODF 1.4
- Microsoft OneDrive / Office Web Apps
- NeoOffice
- Okular
- OnlyOffice
- OpenOffice.org
- Quarto and R Markdown can export to .odt
- Scribus imports .odt and .odg
- SoftMaker Office
- Sun Microsystems StarOffice
- TextEdit
- WordPad (Windows 7 and later, Windows Server 2008 R2 and later) supports ODF 1.1
- Zoho Office Suite

Various organizations have announced development of conversion software (including plugins and filters) to support OpenDocument on Microsoft's products. Microsoft first released support for the OpenDocument Format in Office 2007 SP2. However, the implementation faced substantial criticism and the ODF Alliance and others claimed that the third party plugins provided better support. Microsoft Office 2010 can open and save OpenDocument Format documents natively, although not all features are supported. In July 2024, Microsoft announced early support for ODF 1.4 in Microsoft 365, starting with version 2404 for Windows and 16.84 for macOS.

Starting with Mac OS X 10.5, the TextEdit application and Quick Look preview feature support the OpenDocument Text format.

== Licensing ==
=== Public access to the standard ===
Versions of the OpenDocument Format approved by OASIS are available for free download and use. The ITTF has added ISO/IEC 26300 to its "list of freely available standards"; anyone may download and use this standard free-of-charge under the terms of a click-through license.

=== Additional royalty-free licensing ===
Obligated members of the OASIS ODF TC have agreed to make deliverables available to implementors under the OASIS Royalty Free with Limited Terms policy.

Key contributor Sun Microsystems made an irrevocable intellectual property covenant, providing all implementers with the guarantee that Sun will not seek to enforce any of its enforceable U.S. or foreign patents against any implementation of the OpenDocument specification in which development Sun participates to the point of incurring an obligation.

A second contributor to ODF development, IBM – which, for instance, has contributed Lotus spreadsheet documentation – has made their patent rights available through their Interoperability Specifications Pledge in which "IBM irrevocably covenants to you that it will not assert any Necessary Claims against you for your making, using, importing, selling, or offering for sale Covered Implementations."

The Software Freedom Law Center has examined whether there are any legal barriers to the use of the OpenDocument Format (ODF) in free and open source software arising from the standardization process. In their opinion ODF is free of legal encumbrances that would prevent its use in free and open source software, as distributed under licenses authored by Apache and the FSF.

== Response ==
=== Support for OpenDocument ===
Several governments, companies, organizations and software products support the OpenDocument format. For example:

- The OpenDoc Society runs frequent ODF Plugfests in association with industry groups and Public Sector organisations. The 10th Plugfest was hosted by the UK Government Digital Service in conjunction with industry associations including the OpenForum Europe and OpenUK (formerly Open Source Consortium).
  - An output of the 10th Plugfest was an ODF toolkit which includes "Open Document Format principles for Government Technology" that has the purpose of simply explaining the case for ODF directed at the "average civil servant" and includes an extract from the UK Government policy relating to Open Document Format.
  - The toolkit also includes a single page graphical image designed to articulate the consequences of not choosing Open Document Format. The illustration has now been translated into more than 10 languages.
- Information technology companies like Apple Inc., Adobe Systems, Google, IBM, Intel, Microsoft, Nokia, Novell, Red Hat, Oracle as well as other companies who may or may not be working inside the OASIS OpenDocument Adoption Technical Committee.
- Over 600 companies and organizations promote OpenDocument format through The OpenDocument Format Alliance.
- NATO with its 26 members uses ODF as a mandatory standard for all members.
- The TAC (Telematics between Administrations Committee), composed of e-government policy-makers from the 27 European Union Member States, endorsed a set of recommendations for promoting the use of open document formats in the public sector.
- The free office suites Apache OpenOffice, Calligra, KOffice, NeoOffice and LibreOffice all use OpenDocument as their default file format.
- Several organisations, such as the OpenDocument Fellowship and OpenDoc Society were founded to support and promote OpenDocument.
- The UK government has adopted ODF as the standard for all documents in the UK civil service
- The Russian government has recommended adopting ODF as the standard in the public sector as by GOST R ISO/MEK 26300-2010
- The Wikimedia Foundation supports ODF export from MediaWiki, which powers Wikipedia and a number of other Internet wiki-based sites.
- The default text processing applications in Windows 10 (WordPad) and Mac OS 10.9 (TextEdit) support OpenDocument Text.

On 4 November 2005, IBM and Sun Microsystems convened the "OpenDocument (ODF) Summit" in Armonk, New York, to discuss how to boost OpenDocument adoption. The ODF Summit brought together representatives from several industry groups and technology companies, including Oracle, Google, Adobe, Novell, Red Hat, Computer Associates, Corel, Nokia, Intel, and Linux e-mail company Scalix (LaMonica, 10 November 2005). The providers committed resources to technically improve OpenDocument through existing standards bodies and to promote its usage in the marketplace, possibly through a stand-alone foundation. Scholars have suggested that the "OpenDocument standard is the wedge that can hold open the door for competition, particularly with regard to the specific concerns of the public sector." Indeed, adoption by the public sector has risen considerably since the promulgation of the OpenDocument format initiated the 2005/2006 time period.

- Different applications using ODF as a standard document format have different methods of providing macro/scripting capabilities. There is no macro language specified in ODF. Users and developers differ on whether inclusion of a standard scripting language would be desirable.
- The ODF specification for tracked changes is limited and does not fully specify all cases, resulting in implementation-specific behaviors. In addition, OpenDocument does not support change tracking in elements like tables or MathML.
- It is not permitted to use generic ODF formatting style elements (like font information) for the MathML elements.

== Adoption ==
One objective of open formats like OpenDocument is to guarantee long-term access to data without legal or technical barriers, and some governments have come to view open formats as a public policy issue. Several governments around the world have introduced policies of partial or complete adoption. What this means varies from case to case; in some cases, it means that the ODF standard has a national standard identifier; in some cases, it means that the ODF standard is permitted to be used where national regulation says that non-proprietary formats must be used, and in still other cases, it means that some government body has actually decided that ODF will be used in some specific context. The following is an incomplete list:

- International
  - NATO
  - European Union
- Argentina
- Belgium
- Brazil
- Croatia
- Finland
- Denmark
- France
- Germany
- Hungary
- India
- Italy
- Japan
- Latvia
- Malaysia
- Netherlands
- Norway
- Poland
- Portugal
- Russia (Note: The standard that was proclaimed to be national is in fact the following: ISO/IEC 26300:2006 "Information technology—Open Document Format for Office Applications (OpenDocument) v1.0". Designation as the national standard only means that it is encouraged to be used voluntarily and is not legally binding. The Eurasian Economic Union is the territory where the standard is assumed to be applied.)
- Slovakia
- Sweden
- Serbia
- South Africa
- South Korea
- Switzerland
- Taiwan
- Turkey
- United Kingdom
- Uruguay
- Venezuela

Subnational

- Andalusia, Spain
- Assam, India
- Extremadura, Spain
- Hong Kong, China
- Kerala, India
- Massachusetts, United States
- Misiones, Argentina
- Munich, Bavaria, Germany
- Paraná, Brazil

== See also ==
- Comparison of Office Open XML and OpenDocument
- Comparison of document markup languages
- List of document markup languages
- List of software that supports OpenDocument
- OpenDocument technical specification
- Reactions to Microsoft lobbying at ISO
