= OpenDesk =

Free and open-source productivity software suite

- Developer: Center for Digital Sovereignty in Public Administration
- Release: 20 October 2024; 22 months ago
- License: Apache 2.0
- Website: www.opendesk.eu/en
- Repository: gitlab.opencode.de/bmi/opendesk

OpenDesk (stylised as openDesk) is a free and open-source suite of productivity software developed by the German Center for Digital Sovereignty in Public Administration (ZenDiS). Designed for the public sector as an alternative to Microsoft's Office and 365 products, OpenDesk is part of Germany's digital sovereignty project, which aims to reduce the country's reliance on software services from United States technology companies.

The software suite is a web application that integrates a word processor, spreadsheet editor and presentation program (Collabora Online); cloud storage service (Nextcloud); email server, digital calendar and contact manager (Open-Xchange); instant messenger (Element); videotelephony service (Jitsi); project management tool (OpenProject); and wiki (XWiki). OpenDesk is provided in community and enterprise editions, with the latter in both self-hosted and software-as-a-service (SaaS) configurations.

== History ==
OpenDesk was initially created as a fork of Dataport Phoenix (dPhoenix), an abandoned office suite project funded by the Federal Ministry of the Interior. ZenDiS started collaborating with the French Interministerial Digital Directorate (DINUM) in February 2024 to develop features for OpenDesk and its French equivalent, LaSuite. The agencies added videotelephony, note-taking, and single sign-on features to both software suites in 100 workdays. Through government procurement, ZenDiS began employing open-source software firm B1 Systems in August 2024 to create and maintain OpenDesk's enterprise edition.

On 20 October 2024, ZenDiS released version 1.0 of OpenDesk. As of that year, according to iX, the German government had allocated a combined €45 million to ZenDiS for OpenDesk development. Golem reported in August 2024 that the German government funded OpenDesk with slightly under 0.1% of the amount it had been spending annually on proprietary software.

Public IT company BWI reached a seven-year agreement with ZenDiS in April 2025 to use OpenDesk within the Bundeswehr, which would additionally merge BWI's BundesMessenger platform into the software suite. In June 2025, the Robert Koch Institute (RKI) health agency announced that ZenDiS would provide OpenDesk to the Federal Ministry of Health's 7,000 users through the ministry's Agora collaboration platform; ZenDiS incorporated an online discussion platform into OpenDesk to meet RKI's requirements.

In response to US president Donald Trump's imposition of sanctions against the International Criminal Court (ICC), which was followed by the ICC's chief prosecutor Karim Khan being disconnected from his Microsoft-hosted email account, the ICC announced in October 2025 that it would switch from Microsoft Office to OpenDesk. The Deutsche Rentenversicherung Bund and Bundesagentur für Arbeit insurers began a trial implementation of OpenDesk in January 2026.

== Components ==
OpenDesk includes the following software applications:

Software applications included in OpenDesk
Icon	Name	Functionality
	Collabora Online	Word processing, spreadsheets, and presentations
	Nextcloud	Cloud storage
	Open-Xchange	Email server, digital calendar and contact manager
	Element	Instant messenger
	Jitsi	Videotelephony
	OpenProject	Project management
	XWiki	Wiki

The applications serve as replacements for proprietary software, including Microsoft's OneDrive cloud storage service, Exchange email server and Teams communication applications. XWiki handles the role of Atlassian's Confluence wiki. Organisations can customise the selection of applications within their deployment of OpenDesk.

Additionally, OpenDesk incorporates the following software components:

Additional software components used in OpenDesk
Name	Functionality
Univention Nubus	Identity and access management (IAM)
ClamAV	Antivirus
Dovecot	IMAP server
Postfix	Mail transfer agent

== Technical implementation ==
In February 2025, Linux-Magazin recommended running OpenDesk in a data centre with a minimum of five to six servers, with three servers reserved for the Kubernetes container orchestration system on which OpenDesk is deployed and the remaining servers dedicated to the OpenDesk applications. While OpenDesk can be hosted on cloud computing platforms that support Kubernetes, Linux-Magazin cautioned that doing so on Amazon Web Services or Microsoft Azure would contradict the purpose of using OpenDesk for digital sovereignty. B1 Systems provides the SaaS configuration of OpenDesk through the cloud computing platform StackIT, which is operated by a subsidiary of the Schwarz Group.

== See also ==
- Adoption of free and open-source software by public institutions
- Comparison of office suites
- Docs (software)
- LiMux
- List of collaborative software
- List of office suites
