= Adoption of free and open-source software by public institutions =

“We migrated key functions from Windows to Linux because we needed an operating system [kernel] that was stable and reliable -- one that would give us in-house control. So if we needed to patch, adjust, or adapt, we could.”

— Official statement of the United Space Alliance, which manages the computer systems for the International Space Station (ISS), regarding Linux usage on the ISS

The use of free software instead of proprietary software can give institutions better control over information technology, i.e. digital sovereignty. A growing number of public institutions have started a transition to free-software solutions, facing different challenges in this process. This grants independence and can also address the often-argued need for public access to publicly funded developments.

See also : List of Linux adopters and List of BSD adopters

== Asia ==
=== India ===
==== Assam ====
In 2009, the Government of Assam state made open source a part of its State IT Policy of 2009. While not mandated, its use is encouraged, and emphasis are given to companies who use FOSS during partnership.

==== Kerala ====
The Government of Kerala, India, announced its official support for Free/Open-Source software in its State IT Policy of 2001. This was formulated after the first-ever free-software conference in India, "Freedom First!", held in July 2001 in Thiruvananthapuram, the capital of Kerala, where Richard Stallman inaugurated the Free Software Foundation of India. Kerala's Government's support for Free Software in 2001 is perhaps the earliest instance of a Government supporting the use of Free Software.

Under the IT@School project the government of Kerala has adopted free and open sourced software for the schools.

=== Jordan ===
In January 2010, the Government of Jordan announced that it has formed a partnership with Ingres Corporation, a leading open-source database-management company based in the United States that is now known as Actian Corporation, to promote the use of open-source software starting with university systems in Jordan.

=== Malaysia ===
Malaysia launched the "Malaysian Public Sector Open Source Software Program", saving millions on proprietary-software licences till 2008.

== Europe ==
=== Austria ===
In 2005, Vienna migrated from Microsoft Office 2000 to OpenOffice.org and from Microsoft Windows 2000 to Linux.

=== Denmark ===
In 2025, in an effort to increase digital sovereignty, Denmark's Minister for Digital Government announced that the Danish government would move away from Microsoft Office to LibreOffice.

=== France ===
==== National Gendarmerie ====
In March 2009, The National Gendarmerie announced that it will totally switch to Ubuntu by 2015. The Gendarmerie has adopted OpenOffice.org, Firefox and Thunderbird. In 2018, a state-operated Matrix network has been deployed.

==== National Assembly ====
As of June 2007, the National Assembly of France has had plans to migrate to Linux, OpenOffice.org and Firefox.

On April 10, 2026, The government of France announced a plan to switch over 2.5 million civil servant workstations from Windows 11 to their own custom Linux distribution.

=== Germany ===
==== Federal government ====
The Center for Digital Sovereignty in Public Administration released the free and open-source productivity software suite OpenDesk in 2024. The Bundeswehr and the Federal Ministry of Health began using OpenDesk in 2025, and the Deutsche Rentenversicherung and Bundesagentur für Arbeit initiated a trial implementation in 2026.

==== Army ====
In 2020, Germany's armed forces commenced using Matrix for internal communications, creating their own application based upon Element.

==== Police ====
In 2018, Germany's police replaced WhatsApp by Moka, a fork of Conversations made by Daniel Gultsch.

==== Munich ====
In 2003, The German City of Munich announced its intention to switch from Microsoft Windows NT-based operating systems to an open-source implementation of SuSE Linux, In June 2004, after a pilot project run by SuSE Linux and IBM there was a final approval for the migration. On 14 April 2005, the city decided to migrate to Debian from a commercial Linux distribution. An adoption rate of 20% was achieved by 2010.

==== Schwäbisch Hall ====
In late 2002, Schwäbisch Hall migrated its 400 workstations to Linux. The factors leading to migration were cost, better security, escape from the treadmill of vendor-driven upgrades.

==== Schleswig-Holstein ====
After a successful pilot project, the state of Schleswig-Holstein announced in April 2024 that the public administration is migrating the PCs of 30,000 employees to free, open-source systems. The migration consists of switching to Linux operating systems, the open document file format ODF, Libre Office, Thunderbird and Nextcloud, among other software. The state government published in November 2024 its "Open Innovation and Open Source Strategy" and gave the order to begin the migration in the Spring of 2025. The objective of this decision is to have "digital sovereignty with open source", "trust and transparency" on their IT resources and promote its "regional digital economy". At the end of 2024 the first requests from the government to the migration providers are already finished for some departments, like: macro migrations, PDF export and accessibility fixes, and trainings. Some of these improvements have already been merged upstream and released on Libre Office latest versions.

=== Portugal ===
In 2000, the Portuguese Vieira do Minho Municipality began switching to free and open-source software.

=== Romania ===
IOSSPL is a free and open source software used for public libraries in Romania.

=== Spain ===
In 2017, The City of Barcelona started to migrate its computer systems away from the Windows platform. The city's strategy was first to replace all user applications with open-source alternatives, until the underlying Windows operating system is the only proprietary software remaining. In a final step, the operating system replaced with Linux.

== North America ==
=== Canada ===
In 2017, the city of Sault Ste. Marie, Ontario, opened up most of its new internal software development efforts to reduce its own software costs, and increase collaboration with other municipalities looking to solve similar problems.

=== United States ===
In September 2006, the Commonwealth of Massachusetts announced its formal adoption of the OpenDocument standard for all Commonwealth entities.

In February 2009, the White House moved its website to Linux servers using Drupal for content management.

In August 2016, the United States government announced a new federal source-code policy. This policy mandates that at least 20% of custom source code developed by or for any agency of the federal government must be released as open-source software (OSS). In addition, the policy requires that all source code be shared between agencies. The public release is under a three-year pilot program and agencies are obliged to collect data on this pilot to gauge its performance. The overall policy aims to reduce duplication, avoid vendor 'lock-in', and stimulate collaborative development. A new website code.gov provides "an online collection of tools, best practices, and schemas to help agencies implement this policy", the policy announcement stated. It also provides the "primary discoverability portal for custom-developed software intended both for Government-wide reuse and for release as OSS". As yet unspecified OSS licenses will be added to the code. The US Chief Information Officer Tony Scott, co-author of the policy, blogged "This is, after all, the People's code. Explore it. Learn from it. Improve it. Use it to propel America's next breakthrough in innovation."

== South America ==
=== Argentina ===
The government of Argentina launched the program Conectar Igualdad (Connect Equality), through ANSES and the Ministry of Education (Argentina) launched during the presidency of Cristina Fernández de Kirchner, that gave kids on public schools free laptops to use for educative purposes. By default, it came with Huayra GNU/Linux, a free and open-source Linux operating system developed by the Argentinian technology ministry, based on Debian, using the MATE Desktop.

=== Brazil ===
The government of Brazil migrated from Microsoft Windows to Linux. In 2006, the Brazilian government also encouraged the distribution of cheap computers running Linux throughout its poorer communities by subsidizing their purchase with tax breaks.

=== Ecuador ===
In April 2008, Ecuador passed a similar law, Decree 1014, designed to migrate the public sector to Libre Software.

=== Peru ===
In 2005, the Government of Peru voted to adopt open source across all its bodies. The 2002 response to Microsoft's critique is available online. In the preamble to the bill, the Peruvian government stressed that the choice was made to ensure that key pillars of democracy were safeguarded: "The basic principles which inspire the Bill are linked to the basic guarantees of a state of law."

=== Venezuela ===
In 2004, a law in Venezuela (Decree 3390) went into effect, mandating a two-year transition to open source in all public agencies. As of June 2009 this ambitious transition is still under way.

== See also ==
- OpenDocument adoption
- OpenDesk – a productivity suite by the German government
- Linux adoption
- List of Linux adopters
- Astra Linux – a Linux adoption project by the Russian government
- Canaima (operating system) – a Linux adoption project by the Venezuelan VIT, C.A. and Chinese Inspur
- GendBuntu – a Linux adoption project used by Gendarmerie in France
- LiMux – the Munich city migration program
- Nova (operating system) – a Linux adoption project by the Cuban government
- Red Star OS – a Linux adoption project by the North Korean government
- Pardus (operating system) a Linux adoption project by the Turkish government
- Ubuntu Kylin – a Linux adoption project by the Chinese government
- Unity Operating System – a Linux adoption project by the Chinese government
- de:Open-Source-Software in öffentlichen Einrichtungen (in German)
