= Euro-Office =

FOSS office suite fork of OnlyOffice

- Written in: HTML, JavaScript, C++
- Operating system: Windows, macOS, Linux, iOS and Android
- Type: Productivity software
- License: AGPL-3.0-only
- Website: github.com/Euro-Office
- Repository: github.com/Euro-Office

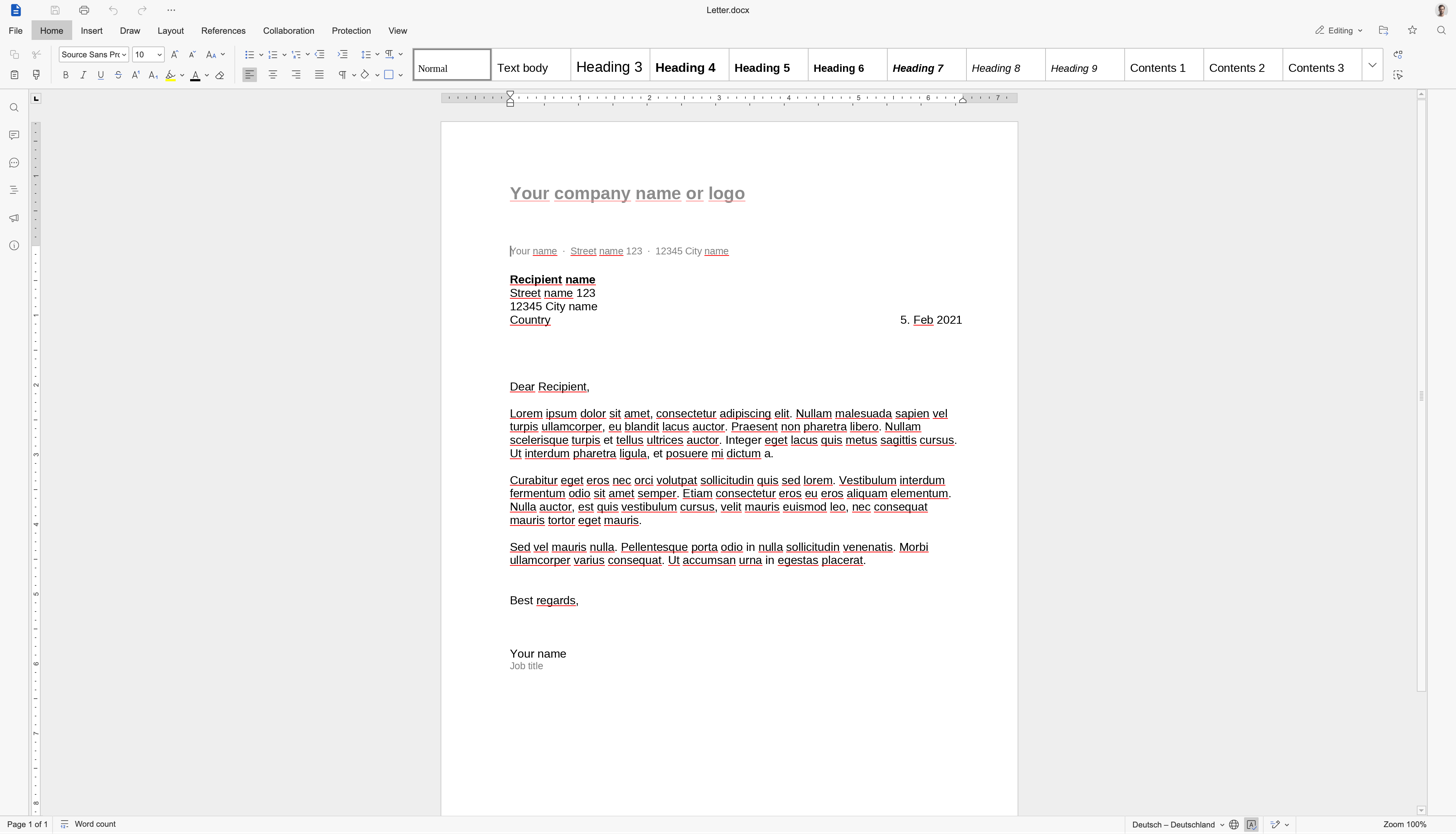
Document being edited in Euro-Office

Euro-Office is a FOSS office suite and collaborative software platform that provides editors for documents, spreadsheets, presentations, and PDFs. The software includes web-based applications designed for document creation, editing, and collaborative work.

Euro-Office was originally designed for web based use with additional use with integration into other platforms: "Developed to be web based and integrated in another product that handles documents, for example a file sharing solution, an online wiki, a project management tool and so on."

As of November 2026, Euro-Office can be installed as stand-alone application by NextCloud.

== History ==
The project began in March 2026 in a quest to gain full independence from Microsoft Office being used in EU public computers. The project is a collaboration between various organizations, companies, and open source developers. The original collaborators were IONOS, Nextcloud, Eurostack, XWiki, OpenProject, Soverin, Abilian and BTactic, with Office EU, Open-Xchange, and Tutanota joining the project soon after its announcement.

Euro-Office is a fork of software from a more restrictively licensed office suite called OnlyOffice.

One of the first changes made to the Euro-Office codebase was to remove licensing terms deemed to be "unenforceable and non-obligatory" additions to the GNU AGPL licence. Three days later, the developers of OnlyOffice responded by publicly calling these changes a licensing violation. Soon after, OnlyOffice announced it would be suspending its partnership with Nextcloud due to the conflict.

In response to these accusations, statements were issued by Nextcloud Software, the Free Software Foundation, and legal experts asserting that both the letter and the spirit of a free software license expressly prohibit the use of license addenda to revoke the freedoms guaranteed by the original license. In the case of the addenda to the GNU AGPL license introduced by the OnlyOffice developers, they contained mutually exclusive requirements (specifically, a simultaneous prohibition on altering branding and a prohibition on the use of the trademark). The position held by the creators of the GNU AGPL—as well as by legal experts—is that restrictive supplementary clauses may be omitted from the license during redistribution; this principle is explicitly stated in Clause 10 of the original GNU AGPL license.

The first stable version was released on 9 June 2026. It was reported that OnlyOffice's allegation of license violation had been resolved.

The first stable desktop application was released on 13 November 2026 by NextCloud. The release is available for Windows 10 and above, Apple MacOS 13 and above and Linux AppImage.

== Products ==
Similar to OnlyOffice, the Euro-Office ecosystem consists of several core applications and tools designed for document editing, collaboration, and workspace management. These include:

Feature/Component	Description
Euro-Office Docs	The core document editing engine providing web-based editors for text documents, spreadsheets, presentations, PDF files, and fillable forms. It supports formats including DOCX, ODT, XLSX, ODS, PPTX, ODP, and PDF. The editors provide real-time collaborative editing with features such as comments, version history, track changes, document comparison, and built-in chat. Euro-Office Docs can be deployed on a private server or used through cloud services.

== Reception ==
Some supporters of the open source competitor LibreOffice, questioned some of the motives and logic concerning Euro-Office in using Microsoft standards by indicating that by seeking to be fully Microsoft compatible, Euro-Office is inadvertently reinforcing Microsoft going forward as the global dominant standard rather than supporting development of competing standards.
