= OnlyOffice =

Office suite developed by Ascensio System SIA

- Developer: Ascensio System SIA
- Release: 31 July 2009; 17 years ago
- Stable release: 10.0 / 10 October 2026; 9 days ago
- Written in: HTML, JavaScript, C++
- Operating system: Windows, macOS, Linux, iOS and Android
- Available in: 47 languages
- Type: Productivity software
- License: AGPL-3.0-only; Proprietary
- Website: www.onlyoffice.com
- Repository: github.com/OnlyOffice

OnlyOffice (formerly TeamLab) is an office suite and collaborative software platform that provides editors for documents, spreadsheets, presentations, and PDFs. The software includes web-based, desktop, and mobile applications designed for document creation, editing, and collaborative work. The desktop client uses the Chromium Embedded Framework.

The project is primarily distributed under the GNU Affero General Public License (AGPL-3.0), with commercial licensing options available for enterprise and developer editions. The software is developed by Ascensio System SIA and its source code is publicly available on GitHub.

OnlyOffice has been adopted by French government organizations, and is available in 47 languages.

== History ==
=== TeamLab project ===
The project began in 2009 under the name TeamLab, developed as a platform for internal team collaboration that included social networking tools such as blogs, forums, wikis, and project management features.

In March 2012, TeamLab presented HTML5-based online document editors at CeBIT, a technology trade fair held in Hanover, Germany.

=== Rebranding to OnlyOffice ===
In July 2014, the project was renamed OnlyOffice. During the same year, the source code of the editors was published on GitHub and SourceForge under the AGPL-3.0 licence, making the software available as an open-source project.

=== Desktop and ecosystem expansion ===
In 2020, the product line was reorganised into several components, including OnlyOffice Docs, OnlyOffice Workspace, and OnlyOffice Groups. In 2021, support for the Web Application Open Platform Interface (WOPI) protocol was added to improve integration with external platforms.

In 2022, the project introduced OnlyOffice Forms, enabling users to create and fill interactive PDF forms.

In April 2023, the developers released OnlyOffice DocSpace, a collaboration environment organised around shared workspaces and document rooms.

In 2023 the company reorganised its corporate structure, establishing a holding company in Singapore while maintaining development and operational offices in multiple countries.

In March 2026, the developers of OnlyOffice publicly responded to Euro-Office's removal of certain licensing terms deemed to be "unenforceable and non-obligatory" additions to the GNU AGPL licence by calling it illegal.

In response to these accusations, statements were issued by Nextcloud Software, the Free Software Foundation, and legal experts asserting that both the letter and the spirit of a free software license expressly prohibit the use of license addenda to revoke the freedoms guaranteed by the original license. In the case of the addenda to the GNU AGPL license introduced by the OnlyOffice developers, they contained mutually exclusive requirements (specifically, a simultaneous prohibition on altering branding and a prohibition on the use of the trademark). The position held by the creators of the GNU AGPL—as well as by legal experts—is that restrictive supplementary clauses may be omitted from the license during redistribution; this principle is explicitly stated in Clause 10 of the original GNU AGPL license. Consequently, the developers of Euro-Office possess the full legal right to distribute the product without including these additional restrictive clauses in the accompanying license. OnlyOffice fixed these issues starting with 9.4; the license is now fully non-contradictory.

== Products and components ==
The OnlyOffice ecosystem consists of several core applications and tools designed for document editing, collaboration, and workspace management. These include:

Feature/Component	Description
OnlyOffice Docs	The core document editing engine providing web-based editors for text documents, spreadsheets, presentations, PDF files, and fillable forms. It supports formats including DOCX, ODT, XLSX, ODS, PPTX, ODP, and PDF. The editors provide real-time collaborative editing with features such as comments, version history, track changes, document comparison, and built-in chat. OnlyOffice Docs can be deployed on a private server or used through cloud services.
OnlyOffice Desktop Editors	A cross-platform desktop application for Windows, Linux, and macOS that enables offline document editing using the same core technology as the web editors. The application is distributed under the AGPL-3.0 licence and supports collaborative editing when connected to platforms such as Nextcloud, ownCloud, Seafile, kDrive, or OnlyOffice DocSpace.
OnlyOffice DocSpace	A document collaboration platform introduced in 2023 that organises content into rooms with configurable access permissions. It is designed to support collaboration between teams, clients, and external partners and is available as both a cloud service and a self-hosted solution.
OnlyOffice Workspace	An integrated productivity platform that combines OnlyOffice Docs with additional modules including document management, project management, customer relationship management (CRM), email, calendar, and an internal corporate social network.
OnlyOffice Document Builder	A document generation tool that enables developers to programmatically create and modify documents, spreadsheets, and presentations using JavaScript-based scripts without running the editors.
Mobile applications	Applications for Android and iOS that allow users to view, edit, and collaborate on documents using mobile devices.

=== File format compatibility ===
The editors support multiple document formats including:

- Word processing formats
  - Editing support: DOCX
  - Viewing support includes: ODT, RTF, and TXT
- Spreadsheet formats
  - Editing support: XLSX
  - Viewing support includes: ODS, and CSV
- Presentation formats
  - Editing support: PPTX
  - Viewing support includes: ODP
- Portable Document Format (PDF)

Compatibility with formats used by Microsoft Office is a major focus of the software.

== Licensing ==
OnlyOffice is distributed under several licensing models:

- Community Edition: open-source version released under the AGPL-3.0 licence
- Enterprise Edition: commercial edition with additional enterprise features and support
- Developer Edition: licence for embedding the editors in third-party software

Desktop and mobile editors are available for free use, while enterprise deployments may require commercial licensing.

== Integrations ==
OnlyOffice provides connectors and APIs that enable integration with third-party platforms. Supported integrations include file-sharing services, enterprise content management systems, and content management systems such as WordPress and Moodle. The software also supports the WOPI protocol, allowing interoperability with compatible platforms.

== Artificial intelligence integration ==
Artificial intelligence features were introduced to the platform in the early 2020s through an optional plugin architecture. The system allows users to connect external AI services or locally hosted models to assist with tasks such as text generation, summarisation, translation, and grammar correction. Later versions introduced contextual AI assistants within the editors and workspace-level automation tools within DocSpace. AI features are not enabled by default and require configuration by the user.

== Organization ==
Based in Riga, Latvia, OnlyOffice owner Ascensio System SIA was a subsidiary of Russian-based New Communication Technologies (not to be confused with the company The New Cloud Technologies, which develops an unrelated office suite named MyOffice (Russian: МойОфис)). Due to EU economic sanctions targeting Russia, European organizations that used the commercial version of OnlyOffice were prohibited from doing so.

== Forks ==
In Russia, Ascensio sold a similar fork under the name R7-Office (Russian: Р7 Офис). According to Ascensio, their Russian business operations were handed to a separate legal entity in 2019, and since 2023, they have "no shared codebase, ownership, or ongoing cooperation" with R7-Office.

In response to EU's digital sovereignty aspirations (particularly for independence from Microsoft Office), and a perceived failed attempt at collaborating with OnlyOffice, a group of EU-based companies started developing a fork named Euro-Office.

== See also ==
- List of office suites
- Comparison of office suites
- Collaborative software
- List of collaborative software
- Project management software
- Comparison of project management software
