= DRV =

DRV may refer to:

- Darunavir, an antiretroviral drug (treatment of HIV), which inhibits the viral protease
- Democratic Republic of Vietnam (Vietnamese: Việt Nam Dân chủ Cộng hòa), i.e. North Vietnam, a socialist country that existed from 1945 to 1976
- Deutscher Radfahrer-Verband, the cycling unit of the Nazi Sports Office (NSRL)
- Deutsche Rentenversicherung, German statutory pension insurance
- Deutscher Rugby-Verband, (German Rugby Federation)
- Dietary Reference Values, the UK's Department of Health's nutritional intake recommendations
- Deletion review, a process used on Wikipedia
