= ZenDiS =

German public administration enterprise on digital sovereignty

The Center for Digital Sovereignty of Public Administration (ZenDiS, or Zentrum für Digitale Souveränität der Öffentlichen Verwaltung) is a public enterprise that advises the German public administration at the federal, state, and municipal levels on digital sovereignty, primarily through the promotion of Open source software in public institutions. To this end, ZenDiS operates the collaborative development platform openCode and the online office suite openDesk.

ZenDiS operates under the auspices of the Federal Government Commissioner for Information Technology (BfIT). Its sole shareholder is the Federal Republic of Germany (FRG). Participation by the German states is planned, but as of early 2025 this had not yet been implemented.

== History ==
The organization originated from long-running discussions on digital sovereignty and a resolution by the IT Planning Council in 2021. In December 2022, the Center for Digital Sovereignty was established at the Federal Ministry of the Interior and Community (BMI). Civil servant Andreas Reckert-Lodde became interim managing director, and from late 2023 shared the role with Ralf Kleindiek.

In 2024, ZenDiS assumed responsibility for the openCoDE and openDesk projects from the BMI. From October 2024 onward, Jutta Horstmann as CTO and Alexander Pockrandt as CFO formed the executive management team. Horstmann was unexpectedly dismissed by the BMI in April 2025. Pamela Krosta-Hartl succeeded her in November 2025.

== openCode ==
openCode logo

openCode is a software development platform for the exchange of open-source software within public administration. A central component of the offering is a public GitLab instance for sharing source code.

openCode is used for publications by, among others, the Federal Ministry of the Interior and Community (BMI), bodies of the IT Planning Council, the Federal IT Cooperation (FITKO), the DigitalService, BWI GmbH, the Robert Koch Institute, and the Free State of Thuringia.

In addition to its intended primary purpose of source code exchange, the openCode GitLab is also used by various public bodies for purely editorial purposes. Examples include the publication of technical concepts and documentation, as well as third-party commentary on content.

The openCode platform was developed in the context of the German Administrative Cloud Strategy through a project of the Federal Ministry of the Interior and Community together with the states of Baden-Württemberg and North Rhine-Westphalia.

== openDesk ==
openDesk logo

openDesk is a groupware and collaboration software suite that bundles various open-source components. This enables public administration in Germany to choose more freely between IT solutions, components, and providers. openDesk positions itself as a digitally sovereign alternative to Microsoft 365. openDesk includes the following components:

- Nextcloud as a file manager
- Collabora Online as an online office suite
- Element as a Matrix client and Synapse as the server
- XWiki
- Open-Xchange
- OpenProject
- Jitsi Meet
- Univention Nubus for identity management, based on OpenLDAP and Keycloak

openDesk is available as an on-premises or SaaS offering and runs exclusively on Kubernetes. ZenDiS awards the further development of openDesk to service providers through a framework agreement. The cloud-based version of openDesk has been available to public institutions since late September 2024 and has since gained broad recognition beyond Germany.

Users include BWI GmbH for the Bundeswehr and the Public Health Service (ÖGD).

After the International Criminal Court became the target of US sanctions, the court began planning the introduction of openDesk as a replacement for Microsoft-provided IT infrastructure.

== Docs ==
In cooperation with the French Interministerial Directorate for Digital Affairs, ZenDiS is developing Docs, an application for real-time collaborative writing.
