= Collaborative project =

Collaborative project may refer to:

- Collaboration
- Teamwork
- Crowdsourced projects

== See also ==
- Collaborative writing
- Collaborative editing
