= Univention Corporate Server =

Univention Corporate Server (UCS)
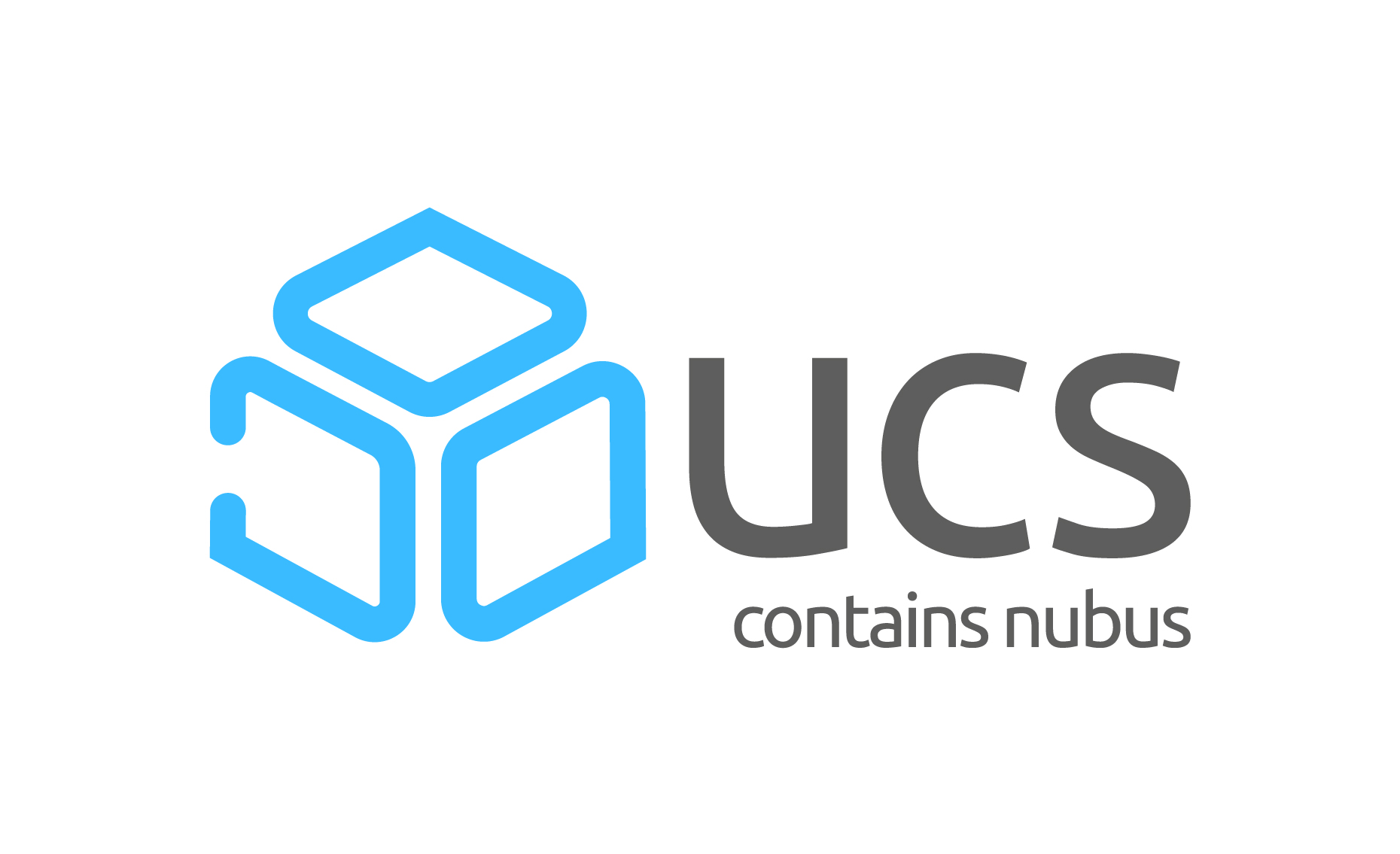

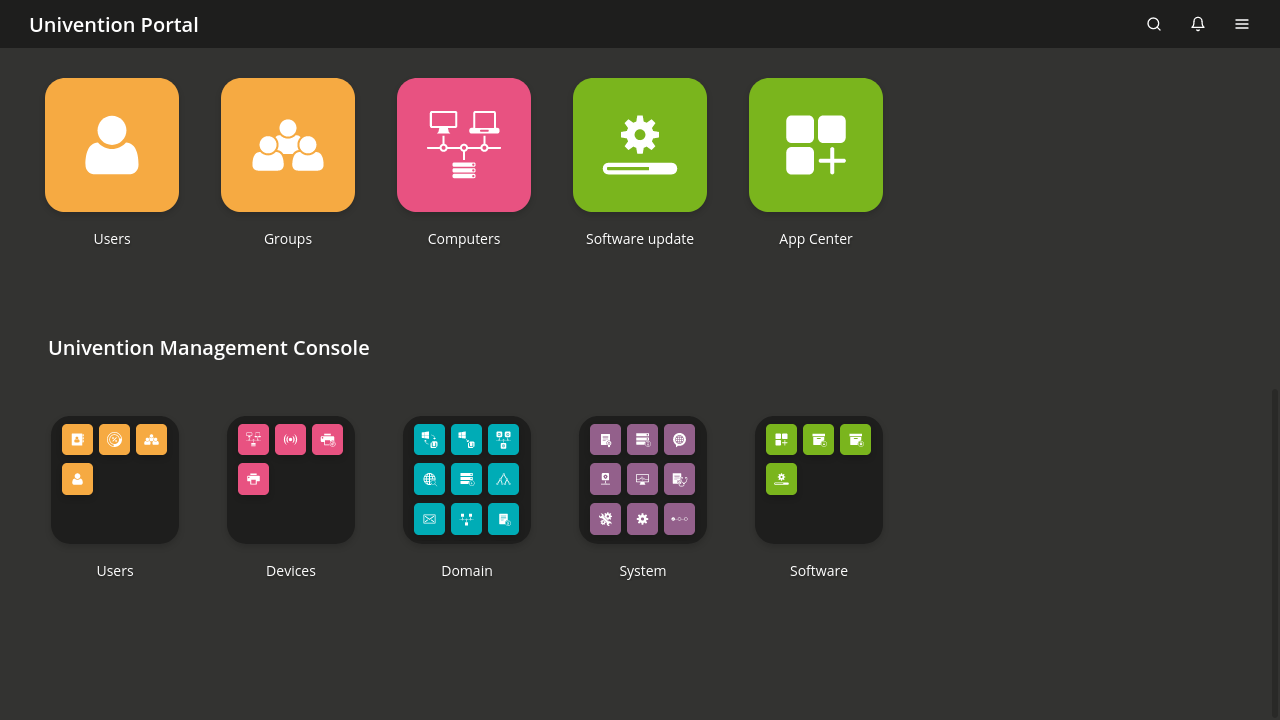
- Overview page of the Univention Management Console, the web-based management interface of UCS
- Developer: Univention GmbH
- Written in: Python (mainly)
- OS family: Debian (Linux / Unix-like)
- Working state: Current
- Latest release: 5.2-6 / 15 June 2026; 4 months ago
- Repository: github.com/univention/univention-corporate-server
- Update method: APT (several front-ends available)
- Package manager: dpkg
- Supported platforms: i386, AMD64
- License: AGPL
- Official website: UCS

Univention Corporate Server (UCS) is a server operating system derived from Debian with an integrated management system for the central and cross-platform administration of servers, services, clients, desktops and users as well as virtualized computers operated in UCS. In addition to the operation of local, virtual instances, UCS can also be operated in cloud environments. Via the integration of the open source software Samba 4, Univention also supports the functions provided in many companies by Microsoft Active Directory for the administration of computers operated with Microsoft Windows. UCS-based components and UCS-certified, third-party products can be installed via the Univention App Center. UCS provides all App Center applications with a runtime environment and services for their operation including a central, consistent management of the apps. Docker containers can also be run on UCS systems and several of the apps available in the App Center are Docker-based.

Univention is a member of the Open Source Business Alliance and supports the creation of the Open Source Business Alliance open source software stacks.

== History ==
The impulse for the development of UCS, which began in 2002, was the lack of a standardised Linux server operating system offering companies and organisations an alternative to Microsoft's domain concept with the proprietary directory service Active Directory. Comparable Linux solutions (e.g., from SUSE and Red Hat) did not offer an integrated, cross-system user and computer management system, with the result that corresponding solutions had to be configured and maintained individually.

Important early driving forces for the development of UCS were initially the Oldenburgische Landesbank and the department of the Bremen Senator for Education and Science, until the product was ready for market launch at the end of 2004. Since then, in addition to new versions, a number of software solutions based on the main product UCS have also been launched.

UCS is predominantly employed in the German-speaking world by companies and public organisations from a wide range of sectors and fields, among others by the regional government authority of the federal state Brandenburg. In 2005, Univention began to market UCS also in other German-speaking countries. Today, UCS is used in many European countries and also outside of Europe, for example, in Australia, Nigeria and the USA where Univention established a subsidiary in 2013.

== Licenses and editions ==
UCS is open-source software; The proprietary developments of Univention GmbH included in UCS were published under the GNU GPL until Version 2.3. With the launch of Version 2.4, the company switched to GNU AGPL. There are also a range of software appliances based on UCS (e.g., in the groupware, desktop and IT service management fields).

Since 21 April 2015 UCS is freely available to companies in form of the UCS Core Edition, which replaced the previous "free for personal use" license. This Core Edition is a fully featured version and differs from the fee-based edition only in terms of product liability and support.

== Structure and components ==
Univention Corporate Server is based on the Debian Linux distribution. There are numerous open source applications integrated in UCS, for example Samba, the authentication service Kerberos, the virtualization software KVM, and Nagios for the monitoring of servers. The core and important unique selling point of UCS is the central administration tool "Univention Management Console", which allows the cross-system and cross-location management of IT infrastructures. UCS uses the directory service OpenLDAP to save data for identity and system management.

The administration tools are operated via the web-based applications and command-line interfaces. Thanks to the integrated administration service UCS Virtual Machine Manager (UVMM), the administration tools also allow the central administration of virtualized servers and clients, hard drives, CDROM and DVD images as well as the physical systems on which they are operated.

The manufacturer goes to great lengths to guarantee possibilities for the integration of UCS in existing IT environments via the use of open standards and supplied connectors. In this way, the integrated tool Active Directory Connection allows the bidirectional synchronisation of the Microsoft directory service Active Directory and the directory service used in UCS, OpenLDAP. In addition, UCS offers various interfaces for manufacturers of application software enabling them to integrate their applications in the UCS management system.

Since UCS 3.1, UCS provides with "Univention App Center" an own graphic management component for the installation and uninstallation of UCS components and UCS-certified third-party appliances. The Univention App Center includes, beside Univention solutions, for example, the Open Source groupware solutions Kopano, Open-Xchange, the document management system agorum core, the slack alternative Rocket.chat and the dropbox alternatives ownCloud and Nextcloud, with the collaboration solutions ONLYOFFICE and Collabora Online.
