= WOPI =

WOPI may refer to:

- WOPI (AM), a radio station (1490 AM) licensed to serve Bristol, Virginia, United States
- WOPI-CD, a television station (channel 11, virtual channel 19) licensed to serve Kingsport, Tennessee/Bristol, Virginia
- Web Application Open Platform Interface
