= OpenProject (disambiguation) =

OpenProject is a free open-source web application for project collaboration.

OpenProject may also refer to:

- OpenProj, often called OpenProject, a free open source stand alone application for project planning, emulating MS Project
- OpenProject Foundation, the foundation for OpenProject, established 2012 in Berlin, Germany
