= History of computing in South America =

Computing started in south America in 1957, when the first digital computer arrived in Chile. 1979, the Centro Latinoamericano de Estudios en Informática was established in Caracas, Venezuela. During the 1980s, most Latin American universities incorporated computer programs. By the 1990s the research output in computing began to be significant.

== 20th century ==
In 1957, the first digital computer arrived in Chile after the CCU purchased a Univac to be delivered to Valparaíso. The machine was one of the first documented cases in the history of computer science in South America. Among the first computers in Latin America was also the system installed in the Venezuelan offices of the Creole Petroleum Corporation, the initiative becoming a launching pad for computer development in the nation state.

In 1972 Brazil implemented a policy innovation strategy to encourage the economic development of the Brazilian computer industry. This policy project served as a blueprint for policy initiatives across the Latin American continent. The Brazilian government established the CAPRE (Comissao de Coordenacao das Atividades de processamento Eletronico) as division of the planning ministry to review the use of all electronic resources by the government. In 1974 CAPRE was constituted as a regulator so that all imports of computers and electronic components were restrained or approved. In the first ten years this strategy showed remarkable success. In 1982 about 67 percent of installed computers in Brazil had been manufactured locally. Brazil's domestic computer industry was able to take significant shares of the local market from IBM, the Burroughs Corporation, and Hewlett-Packard. In 1986 the government of Argentina signed an integration treaty with the government of Brazil, were informatics was a paramount branch of cooperation.

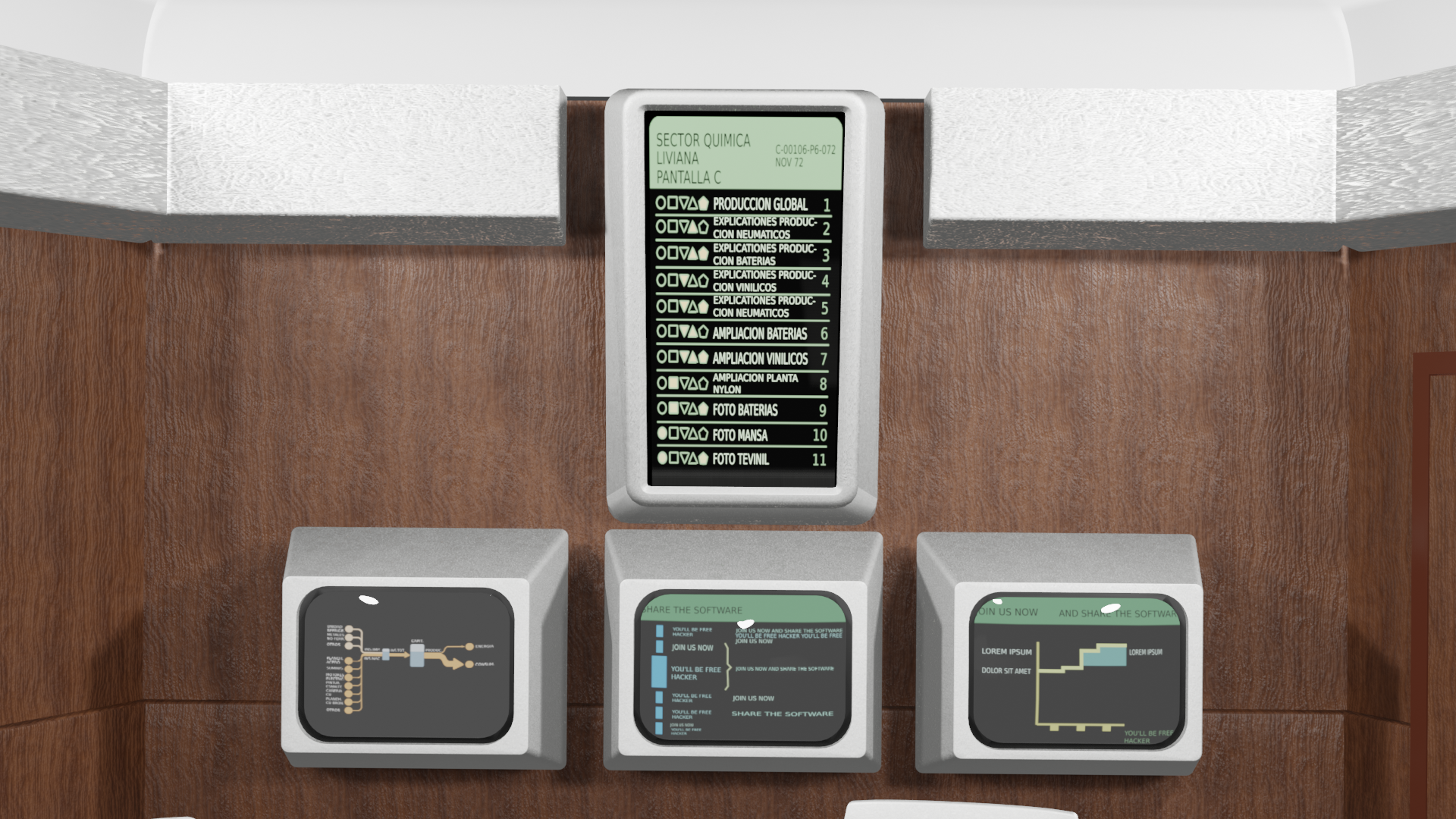
Close-up of the data Feed, Project Cybersyn, Chile

Also in the early 1970s, the short-lived administration of Salvador Allende implemented Project Cybersyn in Chile. Cybersyn consisted of a Cybernet, which was a network of 500 telex machines and planned to connect every factory in the nationalized socialist economy. At the heart of Cybersyn were two computers, a IBM System/360 Model 50 and a Burroughs B3500, on which the program Cyberstride was running. Today Project Cybersyn is remembered for its unique implementation of socialism and the futuristic industrial design.

== 21st century ==
The Free Software Foundation Latin America exists to promote the use of free software in Latin America. In 2009, FSF founder Richard Stallman visited Buenos Aires during the concurrent Wikimania 2009 conference in order to promote free software. Stallman regularly gives speeches in Spanish and has visited Latin America multiples times since 2009.

In 2005, the Chilean government alongside the private IT sector started a program called "Mi Primer PC", with the idea of bringing low-cost PC to the general population. The program was heavily criticized at the time, mainly due to the fact that the computers offered were severely limited due to the usage of Windows XP Starter Edition. This program is not related to the similarly called "Yo Elijo Mi PC" program, put in place during the presidency of Michelle Bachelet which aims to bring computers to primary school students in lower socio-economical classes.

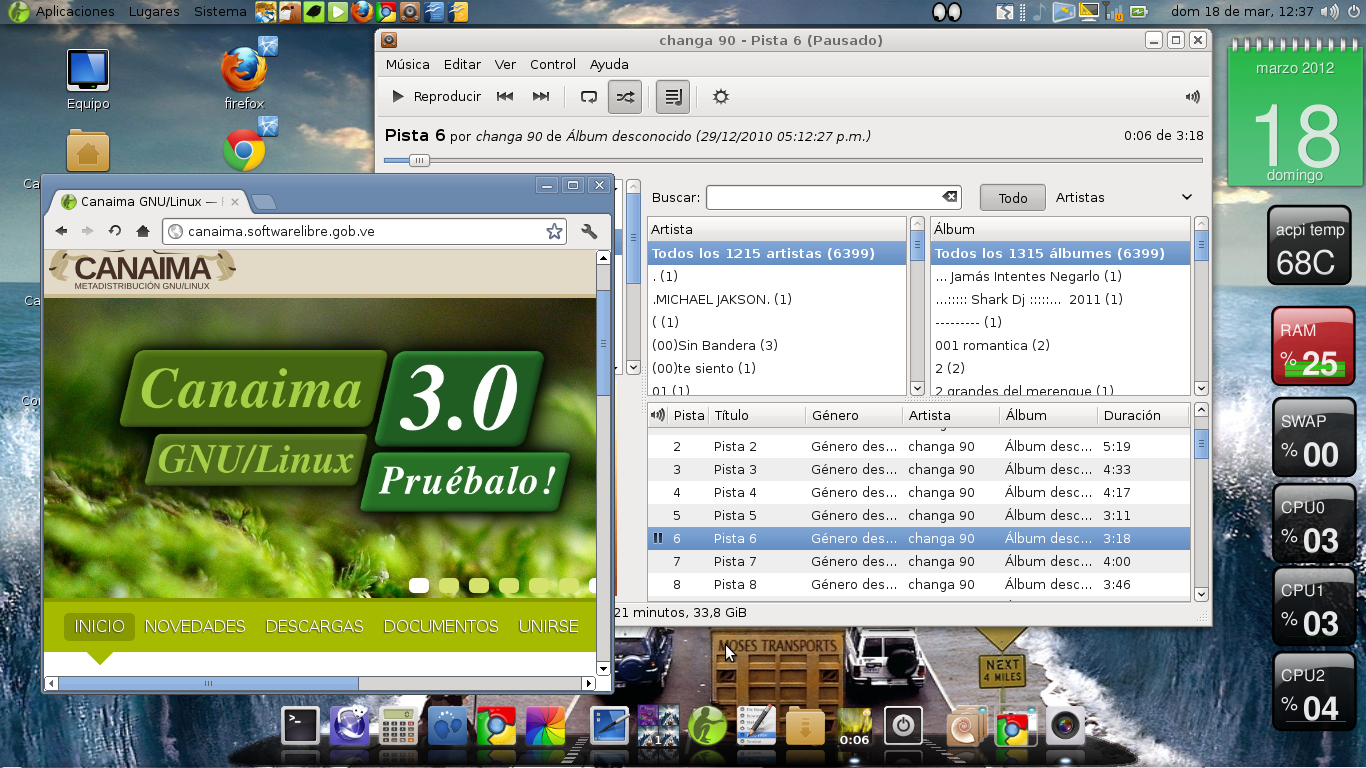
Personalized Canaima GNU/LINUX 3.0 desktop

Since February 2014 Venezuela and Argentina are cooperating to develop their respective Linux operating systems. The Huayra GNU/Linux operating system was launched by Argentina in 2014 to be used on laptops that are distributed to schools. The Canaima operating system runs on 51% of government workstations in Venezuela.

In 2015, Google announced that they would invest US$1 million in computer science in Latin America.Amazon has major telescopes in Chile.

== See also ==
- History of computing hardware
- History of South America
