= DINUM =

French government digital directorate

Interministerial Directorate for Digital Affairs
- Direction interministérielle du numérique DINUM

Agency overview
- Formed: 25 October 2019
- Preceding agencies: Interministerial Directorate for Digital Affairs and State Information and Communication Systems (DINSIC); Interministerial Directorate for State Information and Communication Systems (DISIC)
- Jurisdiction: Government of France
- Headquarters: 20, Avenue de Ségur, Paris, Île-de-France 75007
- Ministers responsible: David Amiel, Minister of Public Action and Accounts; Anne Le Hénanff, Minister Delegate for Artificial Intelligence and Digital Affairs
- Parent agency: Prime Minister of France
- Website: www.numerique.gouv.fr

The Interministerial Directorate for Digital Affairs (Direction interministérielle du numérique, DINUM) is a directorate of the French government. A service of the Prime Minister, it is placed under the joint authority of the Prime Minister and the Minister of Public Action and Accounts, and is also at the disposal of the Ministry of the Economy, Finance and Industrial and Digital Sovereignty. Its mission is to develop the State's digital strategy and to oversee its implementation, acting as the information systems directorate of the State.

== History ==
The first administrations dealing with digital affairs were the interministerial technical support mission for the development of information and communication technologies in the administration (created in 1998), the Agency for Information and Communication Technologies in the Administration (created in 2001), then the Agency for the Development of Electronic Administration (ADAE, created in 2003) within the framework of ADELE.

The General Directorate for State Modernisation (DGME) was created in 2005. It brought together several structures dealing with issues related to State reform and modernisation (budget reform directorate, delegation for users and administrative simplifications, delegation for the modernisation of public management and State structures, and the agency for the development of electronic administration).

The Interministerial Directorate for State Information and Communication Systems (DISIC) was created on 21 February 2011. It took on the role of overseeing the general interoperability framework (RGI), the general accessibility framework for administrations (RGAA), and the general security framework (RGS, a role shared with ANSSI). In 2012, the Interministerial Directorate for the Modernisation of Public Action and the Interministerial Directorate for State Information and Communication Systems formed the Secretary-General for the Modernisation of Public Action (SGMAP).

On 21 September 2015, the Interministerial Directorate for Digital Affairs and State Information and Communication Systems (DINSIC) was created by bringing together the DISIC, Etalab and a small SGMAP mission that would become the State start-up incubator (beta.gouv.fr), still within the Secretary-General for the Modernisation of Public Action until the latter's abolition on 20 November 2017. The interministerial directorate was then placed, by delegation of the Prime Minister, under the authority of the minister responsible for digital affairs and attached to the Secretary-General of the Government. The minister responsible for State reform had authority over it.

On 25 October 2019, the Interministerial Directorate for Digital Affairs (DINUM) was created. Still attached to the Secretary-General of the Government, the Minister of Public Action and Accounts had authority over it, and the Minister of the Economy and Finance and the Secretary of State responsible for Digital Affairs had use of it. This reorganisation resulted in a reduction of the institution's prerogatives, such as the power to "requisition" information from administrations, the obligation to publish an annual report, and its status as a "national competence service". It followed the departures of prominent figures including Henri Verdier, former director of the DINSIC, as well as Christian Quest and several senior staff, who lamented the new strategic directions of the DINUM. Trade unions also noted numerous departures of staff or collaborators, which can also be explained by the institution's historically high staff turnover rate.

Since 2022, under the leadership of Stéphanie Schaer, the DINUM, through its new roadmap, has undertaken a transformation of the State's digital projects.

The director of DINUM also serves as the General Administrator of Data, Algorithms, and Source Codes (AGD), a role created in 2014, making France the first European country to appoint a Chief Data Officer to its government.

=== 2026 transformation into Ariane ===
In May 2026, Prime Minister Sébastien Lecornu announced the transformation of the DINUM into "Ariane", an AI and Digital Authority of the State, placed under the joint supervision of the Prime Minister and the Ministry of the Budget. A portion of its staff would be transferred to the Interministerial Directorate for Public Transformation, particularly those working on accessibility, public service procedures, and services for public service users. The goal of this restructuring is to refocus the agency on its role as the "architect" of the State's digital infrastructure, ensuring cybersecurity and standardising technical protocols across ministries.

== Key initiatives and projects ==
=== FranceConnect ===
The DINSIC designed and has managed the FranceConnect service since 2016. It allows users to connect to various public services (tax authority, health insurance, etc.) or private services (banks, telecoms, etc.), while guaranteeing to those services that the user's legal identity has been verified in advance. FranceConnect acts as a trusted third party between users, public services and private companies.

=== Etalab and open data ===
Etalab is a department within DINUM that coordinates the government's action on open data. It develops and maintains the data.gouv.fr platform, the official French government open data portal launched in 2011, which hosts tens of thousands of public datasets from various organisations.

=== Tchap ===
Tchap is a secure instant messaging application, based on the open-source Matrix protocol and Element, intended primarily for public servants. It aims to replace widely-used applications up to the highest levels of the State, notably Telegram and WhatsApp, which are considered insecure and whose developers and servers are not subject to French sovereignty. In August 2025, a circular from the Prime Minister made the use of Tchap mandatory for work communications in public administrations starting September 2025.

=== LaSuite ===
LaSuite is a collection of free software assembled by the DINUM, some developed in-house, intended for the public administration, including:

- Tchap
- Grist, a spreadsheet incorporating database concepts
- Docs, a note-taking application inspired by Notion, co-developed by the DINUM and ZenDiS
- Visio, a videoconferencing application based on LiveKit
- Messagerie, an email client based on Open-Xchange
- Assistant, a chatbot based on the generative artificial intelligence of Mistral AI

These applications are freely downloadable, and are also made available to municipalities of fewer than 3,500 inhabitants and communities of fewer than 15,000 inhabitants by the National Agency for Territorial Cohesion (ANCT), under the name Suite territoriale.

=== ALLiaNCE and artificial intelligence ===
Launched in September 2024 within the Etalab department, ALLiaNCE is the public AI incubator and community for State agents. It aims to support administrations in the emergence and adoption of AI to improve public services. The incubator coordinates the State's AI strategy and operates an interministerial generative AI foundation.

Albert API is an interministerial generative AI inference platform developed by DINUM. Launched in July 2024, it provides French government entities with access to open-source large language models (LLMs), such as those from Mistral AI and Llama 2, hosted on secure government infrastructure. Albert is designed to assist civil servants with tasks like document analysis, summarization, and administrative drafting, and is integrated into tools like LaSuite.

To address the lack of French-language preference data for training and evaluating LLMs, DINUM and the French Ministry of Culture launched compar:IA in October 2024. It is an open-source digital public service functioning as a "chatbot arena" where users blindly compare responses from different AI models. This tool generates datasets of human preferences in French, which are then made available under open licenses to the academic and industrial community to improve the cultural alignment and performance of AI models in European languages.

=== Digital sovereignty and Linux migration ===
The April 2025 Liberation Day tariffs, imposed 25% duties on technology components. CLOUD Act compels American companies to hand over data from anywhere in the world. LiMux (2004-2017) was a similar project launched by the city of Munich.

In April 2026, the DINUM announced a major initiative to reduce the French government's reliance on non-European technology, particularly American software. As part of this digital sovereignty push, DINUM announced its departure from Microsoft Windows in favour of Linux on its workstations. The plan requires all French ministries to create a strategy by autumn 2026 to adopt non-American tech for PC operating systems, collaboration tools, antivirus software, artificial intelligence, databases, virtualization, and network equipment.

To support this transition, DINUM's Interministerial Products Operator (OPI) department is developing Sécurix, a highly secure, reproducible operating system base built on NixOS. Published on GitHub under an MIT License, Sécurix is designed to meet the strict security recommendations of the ANSSI, incorporating features like TPM2 management, YubiKey-based encryption (LUKS FIDO2), and centralized enrollment for Secure Boot. Alongside it, Bureautix serves as a demonstrator and practical implementation of Sécurix tailored for administrative office use, managing configurations declaratively as code via Git rather than relying on traditional centralized directories like Active Directory.

As of 18 April 2026, deployment is limited to 250 workstations within DINUM. Other initiatives include the State Procurement Department to plan for reducing dependence on American hardware and enlisting France's private sector join the sovereign tech initiative.

== Incidents ==
=== HubEE data breach ===
In January 2026, the DINUM detected an intrusion on HubEE, a document exchange platform it operates for several administrations. The breach, which occurred between January 9 and January 12, resulted in the exfiltration of approximately 160,000 documents from 70,000 files, some containing personal data. The data compromised included information relating to the Family Allowance Fund, specifically concerning Active Solidarity Income recipients, such as social security numbers, names, phone numbers, and email addresses.

== See also ==
- Government Digital Service, in the United Kingdom
- United States Digital Service, in the United States
- Center for Digital Sovereignty of Public Administration (ZenDiS), in Germany
