= List of BSD adopters =

This is a list of companies, organizations and individuals who have moved from other operating systems to a BSD system. In the open-source operating systems field, it can be an alternative to Linux distributions.

== List ==
- WhatsApp infrastructure service is probably the most notable FreeBSD example of adoption on its servers, before switching to Linux after being acquired by Facebook.
- Netflix runs its video-streaming service on FreeBSD servers all over the world
- Until its 3.0 version, Kylin was using FreeBSD as an operating system project in China.
- Mindbridge, a software company, announced in September 2007 that it had migrated a large number of Windows servers onto a smaller number of Linux servers and a few BSD servers. It claims to have saved "bunches of money."
- Dozen of industrial-products manufacturers, especially towards networks and IT-industries, runs FreeBSD on some of their appliances: Juniper, Cisco, NetApp, Dell, Panasonic.
- FreeBSD is used by Sony as the core of PlayStation console range, for their PS3, PS4, and the PS Vita
- FreeBSD has been used by Manex Visual Effects for render farms on CGI-images in The Matrix and others films
- Darwin, the fundamental software base of MacOS and iOS, is based on shared code of XNU, FreeBSD, and Mach kernel, by Avie Tevanian from Carnegie Mellon University
- In 2024, Italian advisor Stefano Marinelli tells how he migrates major part of its client's servers, IT hosters and services providers, to FreeBSD, NetBSD and OpenBSD, shared with some Linux servers, for reliability.
- The Edgio Content Delivery Network (ex Limelight) uses FreeBSD to operate its infrastructure.

== See also ==
- List of Linux adopters
- Adoption of free and open-source software by public institutions#Germany
