= Contributing guidelines =

File inviting user contributions in open-source projects

Contributing guidelines, also called Contribution guidelines, the CONTRIBUTING.md file, or software contribution guidelines, is a text file which project managers include in free and open-source software packages or other open media packages for the purpose of describing how others may contribute user-generated content to the project.

The file explains how anyone can engage in activities such as formatting code for submission or submitting patches.

The existence of the file in a package should increase the chance of a project receiving crowdsourced contributions. But in many cases, the received contributions do not follow the instructions in the file.

Having a contributions file greatly contributes to the success of projects which depend on user contributions.
