= Collaborative editing =

Group production of a document

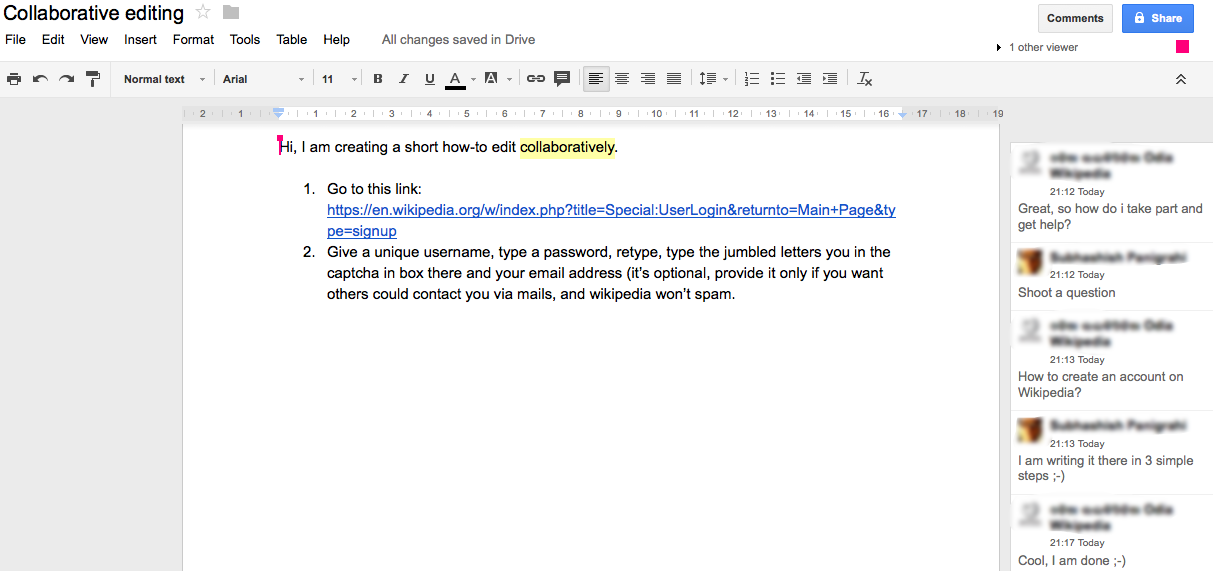
Collaborative editing in Google Docs. All users connected to the document can edit its text directly, and can also post comments in the right-hand sidebar.

Collaborative editing is the process of multiple people editing the same document simultaneously. This technique may engage expertise from different disciplines, and potentially improve the quality of documents and increase deals.

Good choices in group awareness, participation and coordination are critical to successful collaborative writing outcomes.

== Overview ==
The typing might be organized by dividing the writing into sub-tasks assigned to each group member, with the first part of the tasks done before the next parts, or they might work together on each task. The writing is planned, written, and revised, and more than one person is involved in at least one of those steps. Usually, discussions about the document's structure and context involve the entire group.

Most usually, it is applied to textual documents or programmatic source code. Such asynchronous (non-simultaneous) contributions are very efficient in time, as group members need not assemble in order to work together. Generally, managing such work requires software; the most common tools for editing documents are wikis, and those for programming, version control systems. Most word processors are also capable of recording changes; this allows editors to work on the same document while automatically clearly labeling who contributed what changes. New writing environments such as Google Docs, CryptPad or Euro-Office provide collaborative writing/editing functionalities with revision control, synchronous/asynchronous editing.

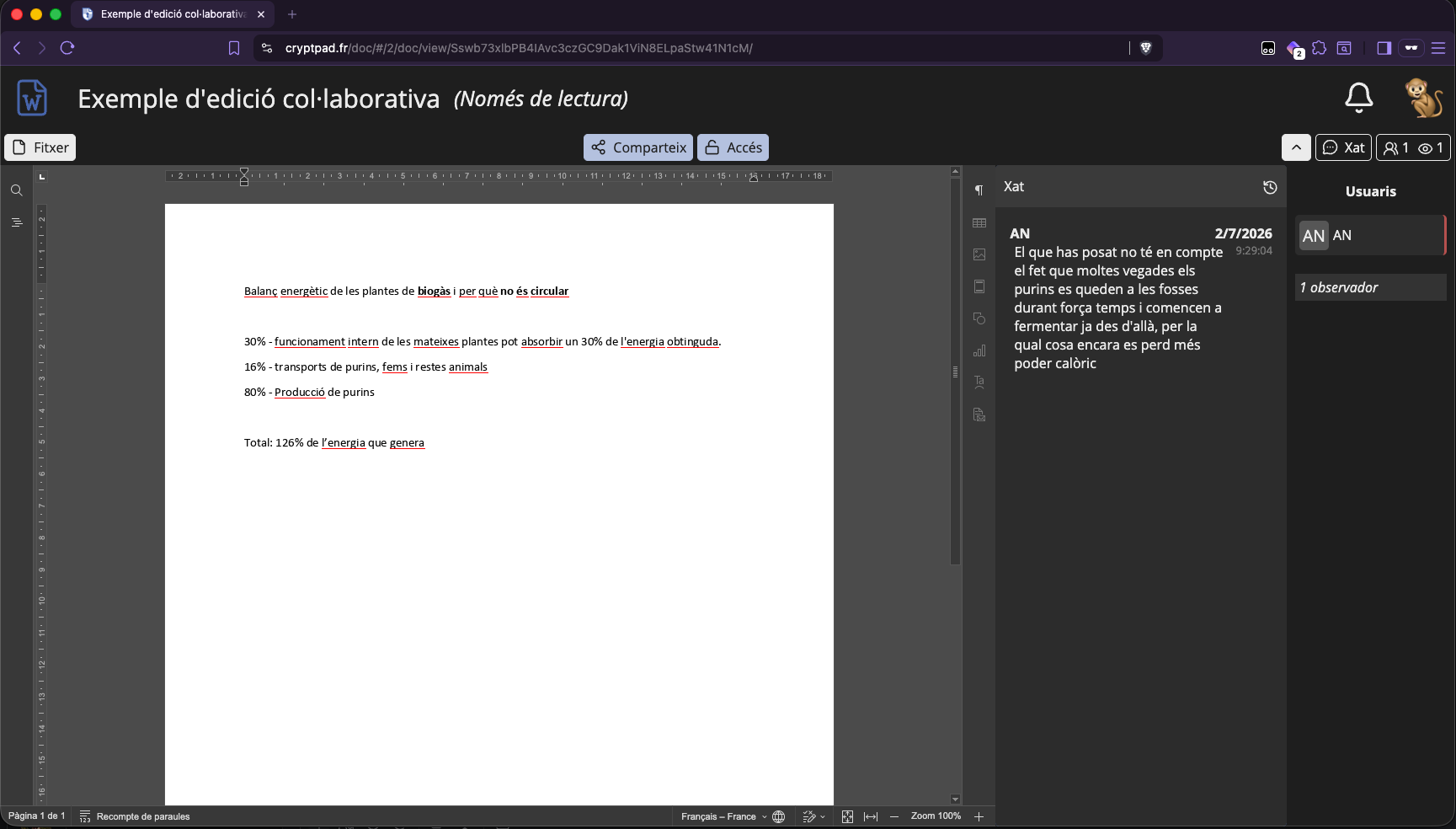
Real-time collaborative editing in CryptPad, with the comments section open where users can chat.

Wikipedia is an example of an open collaborative editing project on a large scale, which can be both good and bad. Because of the large contributions by the public, Wikipedia has one of the widest ranges of material in the world. Editing disagreements may devolve to content and conduct disputes on Wikipedia. Open access also leads to online 'graffiti', in which members of the public can submit incorrect information or random rubbish, sometimes referred to as vandalism. Collaborative writing can lead to projects that are richer and more complex than those produced by individuals. Many learning communities include one or more collaborative assignments. However, writing with others also makes the writing task more complex. There is an increasing amount of research literature investigating how collaborative writing can improve learning experiences. Correct access management systems can prevent duplicated information. Access management systems require access to a server, often online. Online collaboration can be more difficult due to issues such as time zones.

=== Collaborative real-time editing ===
A collaborative real-time editor is a type of collaborative software or web application which enables real-time collaborative editing, simultaneous editing, or live editing of the same digital document, computer file or cloud-stored data – such as an online spreadsheet, word processing document, database or presentation – at the same time by different users on different computers or mobile devices, with automatic and nearly instantaneous merging of their edits.

Real-time editing performs automatic, periodic, often nearly instantaneous synchronization of edits of all online users as they edit the document on their own device. This is designed to avoid or minimize edit conflicts.

With asynchronous collaborative editing (i.e. non-real-time, delayed or offline), each user must typically manually submit (publish, push or commit), update (refresh, pull, download or sync) and (if any edit conflicts occur) merge their edits. Due to the delayed nature of asynchronous collaborative editing, multiple users can end up editing the same line, word, element, data, row or field resulting in edit conflicts which require manual edit merging or overwriting, requiring the user to choose which edits to use or (depending on the system and setup) automatically overwriting their edits or other people's edits, with or without a warning.

== See also ==
- Collaborative writing
- Euro-Office

== Sources ==
- Kuutti, Kari, Eija Helena Karsten, Paul Dourish, Geraldine Fitzpatrick and Kjeld Schmidt. (2003). ECSCW 2003: proceedings of the Eighth European Conference on Computer Supported Cooperative Work (14–18 September 2003, Helsinki, Finland). London: Kulwer. ISBN 978-1-4020-1573-1; OCLC 52784895
- Speck, Bruce W. (2008). Collaborative Writing: An Annotated Bibliography. Charlotte, North Carolina: IAP (Information Age Publishing). ISBN 978-1-59311-285-1
