= Subpage =

Lower level page in a website

A subpage usually refers to a lower level web page in a website or wiki.

== Example website ==
home
news	about	portfolio	contact
study one	study two

In this example website, news, about, portfolio and contact are subpages of home. Also, study one and study two are subpages of portfolio.

Wikis hosted with the MediaWiki software create subpages by adding a slash ("/") after the 'parent' page name. Subpages are used in Wikiversity, where the structure permits contributions by students at any academic level, and in both Wikibooks and Wikisource, where chapters are subpages of a book.
