= Web Application Open Platform Interface =

REST-based document management protocol

Web Application Open Platform Interface (WOPI) is a protocol that enables a client to access and change files stored on a server. The protocol was first released as version 0.1 by Microsoft in January 2012, and as of August 2025 the specification is at version 15.1. The protocol has been adopted by applications outside of Microsoft, such as by Collabora Online, Google, ownCloud and Nextcloud.
