= OpenProject =

Open-source project management software

- Developer: OpenProject GmbH
- Initial release: 4 October 2012; 13 years ago
- Stable release: 17.3.1 / 20 April 2026; 14 days ago
- Written in: Ruby on Rails, Angular
- Operating system: Linux
- Type: Project management software
- License: GPLv3
- Website: www.openproject.org
- Repository: github.com/opf/openproject

OpenProject is a project management software tool. It provides work package tracking, Gantt chart scheduling, Scrum and Kanban boards, time tracking, cost reporting, wiki pages, and document management. The software is written in Ruby on Rails (backend) and Angular (frontend), and is released under the GPLv3.

OpenProject is available as a free community edition and as a commercial enterprise edition with additional features including LDAP group synchronisation, two-factor authentication, and custom actions. Both self-hosted and cloud-hosted deployments are supported.

OpenProject is a component of the German government's openDesk productivity suite, developed by the Centre for Digital Sovereignty in Public Administration (ZenDiS) as a Microsoft 365 alternative for the public sector.

== History ==
OpenProject development began in 2010 as a fork of ChiliProject, itself a fork of Redmine. The fork was motivated by performance, security, and accessibility requirements that could not be met through plugins alone.

The OpenProject Foundation was established in October 2012 by developers and users, and was registered as a German association (VR 32487) at the Amtsgericht of Charlottenburg-Wilmersdorf in June 2013. Version 1.0 was released on 4 October 2012.

OpenProject GmbH, the commercial entity behind the project, provides enterprise support, hosting services, and contributes the majority of development work. The community edition and enterprise edition share the same codebase, with enterprise features enabled by a license key.

In April 2025, the German military IT provider BWI agreed to use OpenProject as part of openDesk within the Bundeswehr.

== Features ==
OpenProject supports both traditional (waterfall) and agile project management methodologies:

- Work packages -- the central unit of work, supporting custom types, statuses, priorities, and workflows
- Gantt charts -- interactive timeline view with drag-and-drop scheduling and dependency management
- Boards -- Kanban and Scrum-style boards for agile workflows
- Backlogs -- Sprint planning with story points and burndown charts
- Time and cost tracking -- logging time spent on work packages, with budget reporting
- Wiki -- per-project wiki pages with Markdown and rich-text editing
- File storage -- integration with Nextcloud and OneDrive for document management
- Meetings -- structured meeting agendas and minutes linked to work packages

== See also ==
- Comparison of project management software
- openDesk
- Redmine
