= Free and open-source software =

Freely licensed software with open code

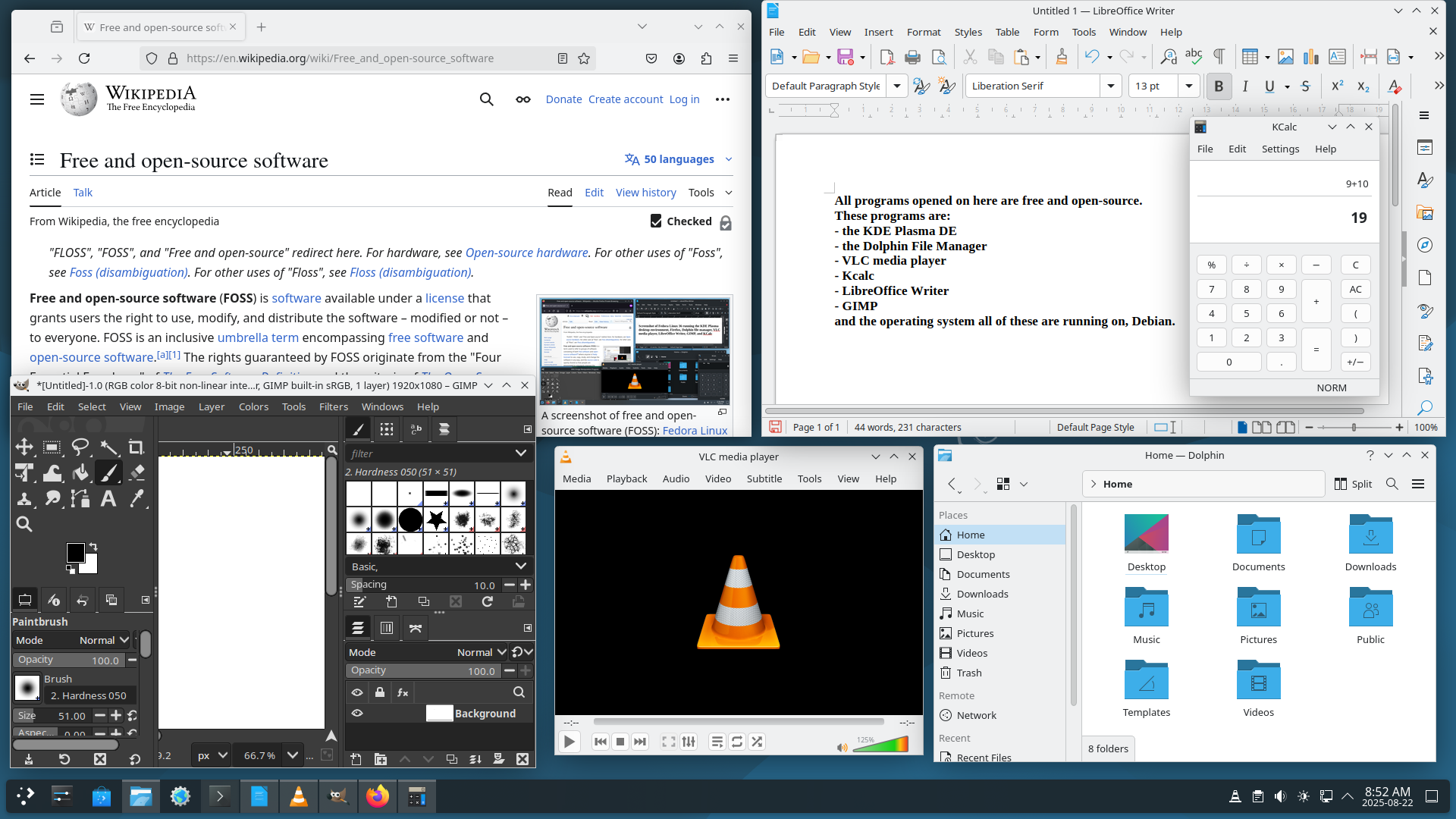
Screenshot of free and open-source software: Debian running KDE Plasma, Firefox, Dolphin, VLC, LibreOffice Writer, GIMP, and KCalc

Free and open-source software (FOSS) is software available under a license that gives users the right to use, share, modify, and distribute the software — modified or not — to everyone and provides the means to exercise those rights using the software's source code. FOSS is an inclusive umbrella term encompassing free software and open-source software. (Note: FOSS is an inclusive term that covers both free software and open-source software, which despite describing similar development models, have differing cultures and philosophical backgrounds. Free refers to the users' freedom to copy and re-use the software. The Free Software Foundation, an organization that advocates the free software model, suggests that to understand the concept, one should "think of free as in free speech, not as in free beer". (See "The Free Software Definition". GNU.) Free software focuses on the fundamental freedoms it gives to users, whereas open source software focuses on the perceived strengths of its peer-to-peer development model.) (Note: Sources describing free and open-source software as an umbrella term encompassing both free software and open source software:) The rights guaranteed by FOSS originate from the "Four Essential Freedoms" of The Free Software Definition and the criteria of The Open Source Definition. All FOSS has publicly available source code, but not all source-available software is FOSS. FOSS is the opposite of proprietary software, which is licensed restrictively or has undisclosed source code.

The historical precursor to FOSS was the hobbyist and academic public domain software ecosystem of the 1960s to 1980s. Free and open-source operating systems such as Linux distributions and descendants of BSD are widely used, powering millions of servers, desktops, smartphones, and other devices. Free-software licenses and open-source licenses have been adopted by many software packages. Reasons for using FOSS include decreased software costs, increased security against malware, stability, privacy, opportunities for educational usage, and giving users more control over their own hardware.

The free software movement and the open-source software movement are online social movements behind widespread production, adoption and promotion of FOSS, with the former preferring to use the equivalent term free/libre and open-source software. FOSS is supported by a loosely associated movement of multiple organizations, foundations, communities and individuals who share basic philosophical perspectives and collaborate practically, but may diverge in detail questions.

== Overview ==
Free and open-source software (FOSS) is an umbrella term for software that is considered free software and open-source software. The precise definition of the terms free software and open-source software applies them to any software distributed under terms that allow users to use, modify, and redistribute said software in any manner they see fit, without requiring that they pay the author(s) of the software a royalty or fee for engaging in the listed activities.

=== Free-software licenses and open-source-software licenses philosophical disagreement ===
Although there is an almost complete overlap between free-software licenses and open-source-software licenses, there is a strong philosophical disagreement between the advocates of these two positions. The terminology of FOSS was created to be a neutral on these philosophical disagreements between the Free Software Foundation (FSF) and Open Source Initiative (OSI) and have a single unified term that could refer to both concepts, although Richard Stallman argues that it fails to be neutral unlike the similar term; "Free/Libre and Open Source Software" (FLOSS).

Proponents of permissive and copyleft licenses disagree on whether software freedom should be viewed as a negative or positive liberty. Due to their restrictions on distribution, not everyone considers copyleft licenses to be free. Conversely, a permissive license may provide an incentive to create non-free software by reducing the cost of developing restricted software. Since this is incompatible with the spirit of software freedom, many people consider permissive licenses to be less free than copyleft licenses.

=== Free software ===
Richard Stallman's The Free Software Definition, adopted by the FSF, defines free software as a matter of liberty, not price, and that which upholds the Four Essential Freedoms. The earliest known publication of this definition of his free software definition was in the February 1986 edition of the FSF's now-discontinued GNU's Bulletin publication. The canonical source for the document is in the philosophy section of the GNU Project website. As of August 2017, it is published in 40 languages.

==== Four essential freedoms of free software ====
To meet the definition of free software, the FSF requires the software's licensing respect the civil liberties / human rights of what the FSF calls the software user's "Four Essential Freedoms".

- The freedom to run the program as you wish, for any purpose (freedom 0). (Note: Zero-based numbering, in which the initial element of a sequence is assigned the index 0, is typically used in computer programming)
- The freedom to study how the program works, and change it so it does your computing as you wish (freedom 1). Access to the source code is a precondition for this.
- The freedom to redistribute copies so you can help others (freedom 2).
- The freedom to distribute copies of your modified versions to others (freedom 3). By doing this, you can give the whole community a chance to benefit from your changes. Access to the source code is a precondition for this.

=== Open-source software ===
The Open Source Definition is used by the Open Source Initiative (OSI) to determine whether a software license qualifies for the organization's insignia for open-source software. The definition was based on the Debian Free Software Guidelines, written and adapted primarily by Bruce Perens. Perens did not base his writing on the Four Essential Freedoms of free software from the Free Software Foundation, which were only later available on the web. Perens subsequently stated that he felt Eric Raymond's promotion of open-source unfairly overshadowed the Free Software Foundation's efforts and reaffirmed his support for free software. In the following 2000s, he spoke about open source again.

== History ==
In the early decades of computing, particularly from the 1950s through the 1970s, software development was largely collaborative. Programs were commonly shared in source code form among academics, researchers, and corporate developers. Most companies at the time made their revenue from hardware sales, and software—including source code—was distributed freely alongside it, often as public-domain software.

By the late 1960s and 1970s, a distinct software industry began to emerge. Companies started selling software as a separate product, leading to the use of restrictive licenses and technical measures—such as distributing only binary executables—to limit user access and control. This shift was driven by growing competition and the U.S. government's antitrust scrutiny of bundled software, exemplified by the 1969 antitrust case United States v. IBM.

A key turning point came in 1980 when U.S. copyright law was formally extended to cover computer software. This enabled companies like IBM to further enforce closed-source distribution models. In 1983, IBM introduced its "object code only" policy, ceasing the distribution of source code for its system software.

In response to the growing restrictions on software, Richard Stallman launched the GNU Project in 1983 at MIT. His goal was to develop a complete Free software operating system and restore user freedom. The Free Software Foundation (FSF) was established in 1985 to support this mission. Stallman's GNU Manifesto and the Four Essential Freedoms outlined the movement's ethical stance, emphasizing user control over software.

The release of the Linux kernel by Linus Torvalds in 1991, and its relicense under the GNU General Public License (GPL) in 1992, marked a major step toward a fully Free operating system. Other Free software projects like FreeBSD, NetBSD, and OpenBSD also gained traction following the resolution of the USL v. BSDi lawsuit in 1993.

In 1997, Eric Raymond's essay The Cathedral and the Bazaar explored the development model of Free software, influencing Netscape's decision in 1998 to release the source code for its browser suite. This code base became Mozilla Firefox and Thunderbird.

To broaden business adoption, a group of developers including Raymond, Bruce Perens, Tim O'Reilly, and Linus Torvalds rebranded the Free software movement as "Open Source." The Open Source Initiative (OSI) was founded in 1998 to promote this new term and emphasize collaborative development benefits over ideology.

Despite initial resistance—such as Microsoft's 2001 claim that "Open-source is an intellectual property destroyer"—FOSS eventually gained widespread acceptance in the corporate world. Companies like Red Hat proved that commercial success and Free software principles could coexist.

== Usage ==
=== Benefits over proprietary software ===
==== Personal control, customizability and freedom ====
Users of FOSS benefit from the Four Essential Freedoms to make unrestricted use of, and to study, copy, modify, and redistribute such software with or without modification. If they would like to change the functionality of software they can bring about changes to the code and, if they wish, distribute such modified versions of the software or often − depending on the software's decision making model and its other users − even push or request such changes to be made via updates to the original software.

==== Privacy and security ====
Manufacturers of proprietary, closed-source software are sometimes pressured to building in backdoors or other covert, undesired features into their software. Instead of having to trust software vendors, users of FOSS can inspect and verify the source code themselves and can put trust on a community of volunteers and users. As proprietary code is typically hidden from public view, only the vendors themselves and hackers may be aware of any vulnerabilities in them while FOSS involves as many people as possible for exposing bugs quickly.

==== Low costs or no costs ====
FOSS is often free of charge although donations are often encouraged. This also allows users to better test and compare software.

==== Quality, collaboration and efficiency ====
FOSS allows for better collaboration among various parties and individuals with the goal of developing the most efficient software for its users or use-cases while proprietary software is typically meant to generate profits. Furthermore, in many cases more organizations and individuals contribute to such projects than to proprietary software. It has been shown that technical superiority is typically the primary reason why companies choose open source software.

=== Drawbacks compared to proprietary software ===
==== Security and user-support ====
According to Linus's law, the more people who can see and test a set of code, the more likely any flaws will be caught and fixed quickly. However, this does not guarantee a high level of participation. Having a team of full-time professionals behind a commercial product can, in some cases, lead to more secure code than in a volunteer-driven FOSS project.

Furthermore, publicized source code might make it easier for hackers to find vulnerabilities in it and write exploits. This however assumes that such malicious hackers are more effective than white hat hackers which responsibly disclose or help fix the vulnerabilities, that no code leaks or exfiltrations occur and that reverse engineering of proprietary code is a hindrance of significance for malicious hackers.

==== Hardware and software compatibility ====
Sometimes, FOSS is not compatible with proprietary hardware or specific software. This is often due to manufacturers obstructing FOSS such as by not disclosing the interfaces or other specifications needed for members of the FOSS movement to write drivers for their hardware – for instance as they wish customers to run only their own proprietary software or as they might benefit from partnerships.

==== Bugs and missing features ====
While FOSS can be superior to proprietary equivalents in terms of software features and stability, in many cases it has more unfixed bugs and missing features when compared to similar commercial software. This varies per case, and usually depends on the level of interest in a particular project. However, unlike close-sourced software, improvements can be made by anyone who has the motivation, time and skill to do so.

A common obstacle in FOSS development is the lack of access to some common official standards, due to costly royalties or required non-disclosure agreements (e.g., for the DVD-Video format).

==== Less guarantee of development ====
There is often less certainty of FOSS projects gaining the required resources and participation for continued development than commercial software backed by companies. However, companies also often abolish projects for being unprofitable, yet large companies may rely on, and hence co-develop, open source software. On the other hand, if the vendor of proprietary software ceases development, there are no alternatives; whereas with FOSS, any user who needs it still has the right, and the source-code, to continue to develop it themself, or pay a 3rd party to do so.

==== Missing applications ====
As the FOSS operating system distributions of Linux has a lower market share of end users there are also fewer applications available.

=== Adoption by governments ===
Governmental adoption of free and open-source software by country
Country	Description
Argentina	The government of Argentina launched the program Conectar Igualdad (Connect Equality), through ANSES and the Ministry of Education (Argentina) launched during the presidency of Cristina Fernández de Kirchner, that gave kids on public schools free laptops to use for educative purposes. By default, it came with Huayra GNU/Linux, a free and open-source Linux operating system developed by the Argentinian technology ministry, based on Debian, using the MATE Desktop.
Austria	In 2005, Vienna migrated from Microsoft Office 2000 to OpenOffice.org and from Microsoft Windows 2000 to Linux.
Brazil	In 2006, the Brazilian government has simultaneously encouraged the distribution of cheap computers running Linux throughout its poorer communities by subsidizing their purchase with tax breaks.
Canada	In 2017, the city of Sault Ste. Marie, Ontario, opened up most of its new internal software development efforts to reduce its own software costs, and increase collaboration with other municipalities looking to solve similar problems.
Ecuador	In April 2008, Ecuador passed a similar law, Decree 1014, designed to migrate the public sector to Libre Software.
France	In March 2009, the French Gendarmerie Nationale announced it would totally switch to Ubuntu by 2015. The Gendarmerie began its transition to open source software in 2005 when it replaced Microsoft Office with OpenOffice.org across the entire organization. In September 2012, the French Prime Minister laid down a set of action-oriented recommendations about using open-source in the French public administration. These recommendations are published in a document based on the works of an inter-ministerial group of experts. This document promotes some orientations like establishing an actual convergence on open-source stubs, activating a network of expertise about converging stubs, improving the support of open-source software, contributing to selected stubs, following the big communities, spreading alternatives to the main commercial solutions, tracing the use of open-source and its effects, developing the culture of use of the open-source licenses in the developments of public information systems. One of the aim of this experts groups is also to establish lists of recommended open-source software to use in the French public administration.
Germany	In the German City of Munich, conversion of 15,000 PCs and laptops from Microsoft Windows-based operating systems to LiMux, a Debian-based Linux environment, spanned ten years (2003 to 2013). It resulted in more than 80% of all its computers were running Linux. On November 13, 2017, The Register reported that Munich was planning to revert to Windows 10 by 2020, but in 2020, Munich decided to shift back from Microsoft to Linux again. In 2022 Germany launched Open CoDE, its own FOSS repository and forum.
India	The Government of Kerala, India, announced its official support for free and open-source software in its State IT Policy of 2001, which was formulated after the first-ever Free software conference in India, Freedom First!, held in July 2001 in Trivandrum, the capital of Kerala. In 2009, Government of Kerala started the International Centre for Free and Open Source Software (ICFOSS). In March 2015 the Indian government announced a policy on adoption of FOSS.
Italy	The Italian military is transitioning to LibreOffice and the OpenDocument Format (ODF). LibreItalia Association announced on September 15, 2015, that the Ministry of Defence would over the next year-and-a-half install this suite of office productivity tools on some 150,000 PC workstations, making it Europe's second-largest LibreOffice implementation. By June 23, 2016, 6,000 stations have been migrated. E-learning military platform.
Jordan	In January 2010, the Government of Jordan announced a partnership with Ingres Corporation (now named Actian), an open-source database-management company based in the United States, to promote open-source software use, starting with university systems in Jordan.
Malaysia	Malaysia launched the "Malaysian Public Sector Open Source Software Program", saving millions on proprietary software licenses until 2008.
Peru	In 2005, the Government of Peru voted to adopt open source across all its bodies. The 2002 response to Microsoft's critique is available online. In the preamble to the bill, the Peruvian government stressed that the choice was made to ensure that key pillars of democracy were safeguarded: "The basic principles which inspire the Bill are linked to the basic guarantees of a state of law."
Portugal	In 2000, the Portuguese Vieira do Minho Municipality began switching to free and open-source software.
Romania	IOSSPL is a free and open source software used for public libraries in Romania.
Spain	In 2017, The City of Barcelona started to migrate its computer systems away from the Windows platform. The city's strategy was first to replace all user applications with open-source alternatives, until the underlying Windows operating system is the only proprietary software remaining. In a final step, the operating system replaced with Linux.
Uganda	In September 2014, the Uganda National Information Technology Authority (NITA-U) announced a call for feedback on an Open Source Strategy & Policy at a workshop in conjunction with the ICT Association of Uganda (ICTAU).
United States	In February 2009, the White House moved its website to Linux servers using Drupal for content management. In August 2016, the United States government announced a new federal source code policy which mandates that at least 20% of custom source code developed by or for any agency of the federal government be released as open-source software (OSS). In addition, the policy requires that all source code be shared strictly between agencies. The public release is under a three-year pilot program and agencies are obliged to collect data on this pilot to gauge its performance. The overall policy aims to reduce duplication, avoid vendor 'lock-in', and stimulate collaborative development. The website code.gov provides "an online collection of tools, best practices, and schemas to help agencies implement this policy", the policy announcement stated. It also provides the "primary discoverability portal for custom-developed software intended both for Government-wide reuse and for release as OSS". As yet unspecified OSS licenses will be added to the code.
Venezuela	In 2004, a law in Venezuela (Decree 3390) went into effect, mandating a two-year transition to open source in all public agencies. As of June 2009, the transition was still under way.

=== Adoption by supranational unions and international organizations ===
==== European Union ====
"We migrated key functions from Windows to Linux because we needed an operating system that was stable and reliable -- one that would give us in-house control. So if we needed to patch, adjust, or adapt, we could."

— Official statement of the United Space Alliance, which manages the computer systems for the International Space Station (ISS), regarding why they chose to switch from Windows to Linux on the ISS.

In 2017, the European Commission stated that "EU institutions should become open source software users themselves, even more than they already are" and listed open source software as one of the nine key drivers of innovation, together with big data, mobility, cloud computing and the internet of things.

In 2020, the European Commission adopted its Open Source Strategy 2020-2023, including encouraging sharing and reuse of software and publishing Commission's source code as key objectives. Among concrete actions there is also to set up an Open Source Programme Office in 2020 and in 2022 it launched its own FOSS repository code.europa.eu.

In 2021, the Commission Decision on the open source licensing and reuse of Commission software (2021/C 495 I/01) was adopted, under which, as a general principle, the European Commission may release software under EUPL or another FOSS license, if more appropriate. There are exceptions though.

In May 2022, the Expert group on the Interoperability of European Public Services came published 27 recommendations to strengthen the interoperability of public administrations across the EU. These recommendations are to be taken into account later in the same year in Commission's proposal of the "Interoperable Europe Act".

== Production ==
Open-source software development (OSSD) is the process by which open-source software is developed. The software's source code is publicly available to be used, modified, and enhanced. Notable examples of open-source software products are Mozilla Firefox, Android, and VLC media player. The development process is typically different from traditional methods such as Waterfall. Instead favoring early releases and community involvement. Agile development strategies are most often employed with OSSD, and are characterized by their iterative and incremental frameworks. Open-source software developers will typically use methods such as E-mail, Wikis, web forums, and instant messaging services for communication, as individuals are not typically working in close proximity to one another. Version control systems such as Git are utilized to make code collaboration easier.

== Issues and incidents ==
=== GPLv3 controversy ===
The GNU General Public License (GPL) is one of the most widely used copyleft licenses in the free and open-source software (FOSS) community and was created by the Free Software Foundation (FSF). Version 2 (GPLv2), published in 1991, played a central role in protecting the freedom of software to be run, studied, modified, and shared by users. However, as technology and legal landscapes evolved, particularly with the rise of Digital Rights Management (DRM) and software patents, some developers and legal experts argued that GPLv2 did not adequately protect user freedoms in newer contexts. This led to the development of GPLv3, which sought to address these concerns.

While copyright is the primary legal mechanism that FOSS authors use to ensure license compliance for their software, other mechanisms such as legislation, patents, and trademarks have implications as well. In response to legal issues with patents and the Digital Millennium Copyright Act (DMCA), the Free Software Foundation released version 3 of its GNU General Public License (GNU GPLv3) in 2007 that explicitly addressed the DMCA and patent rights.

One of the key issues GPLv3 aimed to address was a practice known as Tivoization, named after the company TiVo, which used GPL-covered software but implemented hardware restrictions that prevented users from running modified versions of the software. This was seen by the Free Software Foundation (FSF) as a direct violation of software freedom, prompting GPLv3 to include language explicitly forbidding such restrictions. Additionally, GPLv3 introduced clauses to protect users against aggressive enforcement of software patents and reinforced the idea that users should retain control over the software they use.

After the development of the GNU GPLv3 in 2007, the FSF (as the copyright holder of many pieces of the GNU system) updated many of the GNU programs' licenses from GPLv2 to GPLv3. On the other hand, the adoption of the new GPL version was heavily discussed in the FOSS ecosystem, several projects decided against upgrading to GPLv3. For instance the Linux kernel, the BusyBox project, AdvFS, Blender, and the VLC media player decided against adopting the GPLv3.

Apple, a user of GCC and a heavy user of both DRM and patents, switched the compiler in its Xcode IDE from GCC to Clang, which is another FOSS compiler but is under a permissive license. LWN speculated that Apple was motivated partly by a desire to avoid GPLv3. The Samba project also switched to GPLv3, so Apple replaced Samba in their software suite by a closed-source, proprietary software alternative.

The controversy with GPLv3 mirrored a more general philosophical split in the open source community: whether people should hold licenses that aggressively defend user freedoms (as with copyleft) or take a more permissive, collaborative approach. Supporters applauded GPLv3 for fortifying protections against restrictions imposed by hardware and patent threats, while critics felt it created legal and ideological barriers that complicated its development and made it less appealing to adopt. The fallout helped to raise the acceptance of permissive licenses like the MIT and Apache licenses, especially by commercial software developers.

=== Skewed prioritization, ineffectiveness and egoism of developers ===
Leemhuis criticizes the priorities of skilled developers who − instead of fixing issues in already popular open-source applications and desktop environments − create new, mostly redundant software to gain fame and fortune.

He also criticizes notebook manufacturers for optimizing their own products only privately or creating workarounds instead of helping fix the actual causes of the many issues with Linux on notebooks such as the unnecessary power consumption.

=== Commercial ownership of open-source software ===
Mergers have affected major open-source software. Sun Microsystems (Sun) acquired MySQL AB, owner of the popular open-source MySQL database, in 2008.

Oracle in turn purchased Sun in January 2010, acquiring their copyrights, patents, and trademarks. Thus, Oracle became the owner of both the most popular proprietary database and the most popular open-source database. Oracle's attempts to commercialize the open-source MySQL database have raised concerns in the FOSS community. Partly in response to uncertainty about the future of MySQL, the FOSS community forked the project into new database systems outside of Oracle's control. These include MariaDB, Percona, and Drizzle. All of these have distinct names; they are distinct projects and cannot use the trademarked name MySQL.

=== Legal cases ===
==== Oracle v. Google ====
In August 2010, Oracle sued Google, claiming that its use of Java in Android infringed on Oracle's copyrights and patents. In May 2012, the trial judge determined that Google did not infringe on Oracle's patents and ruled that the structure of the Java APIs used by Google was not copyrightable. The jury found that Google infringed a small number of copied files, but the parties stipulated that Google would pay no damages. Oracle appealed to the Federal Circuit, and Google filed a cross-appeal on the literal copying claim.

== Economics ==
By defying ownership regulations in the construction and use of information—a key area of contemporary growth—the Free/Open Source Software (FOSS) movement counters neoliberalism and privatization in general.

By realizing the historical potential of an "economy of abundance" for the new digital world, FOSS may lay down a plan for political resistance or show the way towards a potential transformation of capitalism.

According to Yochai Benkler, Jack N. and Lillian R. Berkman Professor for Entrepreneurial Legal Studies at Harvard Law School, free software is the most visible part of a new economy of commons-based peer production of information, knowledge, and culture. As examples, he cites a variety of FOSS projects, including both free software and open-source.

== See also ==
- Contributing guidelines
- Contributor License Agreement
- FLOSS Manuals
- FLOSS Weekly
- Free software movement
- Free-software license
- Free and open-source graphics device driver
- List of free and open-source software packages
- List of formerly proprietary software
- Lists of open-source artificial intelligence software
- Open collaboration
- Open-source license
- Openwashing
- Outline of free software
