= BWI GmbH =

German public IT services provider

- Type: GmbH
- Industry: IT systems and services
- Founded: 2006 (as BWI Informationstechnik GmbH)
- Headquarters: Meckenheim, Germany
- Key people: Bernhard Günther (CEO); Katrin Hahn (CRO); Christian Marwitz (CDO)
- Revenue: 2.25 billion € (2025)
- Number of employees: 8,500 (2025)
- Website: www.bwi.de

BWI GmbH is a German public IT services provider owned by the German Federal Ministry of Defence. The company has its roots in the HERKULES project launched in 2006, Germany's largest public–private partnership to date for modernizing the IT of the German Armed Forces. BWI is today responsible for the operation, expansion and maintenance of a large part of the IT systems of the Federal Ministry of Defence and the German Armed Forces.

== History ==
BWI was founded as BWI Informationstechnik GmbH in 2006 as part of the HERKULES project together with the two subsidiaries BWI Systeme GmbH and BWI Services GmbH. With HERKULES, large parts of the non-militarised IT services of the Bundeswehr were outsourced to BWI. Siemens and IBM acted as civilian partner companies, together holding a share of 50.10 percent of the Joint venture. BWI assumed responsibility for the modernization, support and operation of 140,000 PCs, 7,000 servers and 300,000 landline telephones as well as 15,000 cell phones. In addition, the contract included the introduction and operation of SAP enterprise resource management systems in parts of the Bundeswehr as well as the consolidation and operation of the computing centres and WAN and LAN infrastructure of the German military. The 10-year contract expired in 2016. The original contract volume was 7.1 billion euros, making it the largest Public–private partnership in Germany as at 2021. In 2016, all three legal entities of BWI were merged into BWI GmbH and the Ministry of Defence took over the shares of Siemens and IBM. Since then, the entreprise has been fully public-owned. As a result of the non-continuation of the public-private partnership and the takeover of the business shares of Siemens and IBM, the Federal Ministry of Defence was ordered to make a compensation payment to the companies involved.

Since then, the scope of IT services taken over for the Bundeswehr and the Federal Ministry of Defense has been expanded. The company has also grown to over 6,500 employees. This makes it one of the largest IT service providers in Germany. BWI also provides services for other federal ministries and agencies, such as the Federal Ministry of Health. For these other federal institutions, however, the Federal Information Technology Center (ITZBund) is the primary IT service provider.

== Services ==
BWI has divided its services into different portfolios:

- Security Services: Information security consulting, Intrusion detection systems for the German Armed Forces
- Business Services: IT consulting and IT integration services
- End User Services: Operation, maintenance and renewal of desktop PCs, laptops, cell phones.
- Infrastructure Services: Operation, maintenance and renewal of the Bundeswehr's data centers and network structure
- User Support Services: Operation of user support and telephone hotlines.
