= Deutsche Rentenversicherung =

German state pension system

- Founded: October 1, 2005; 20 years ago
- Area served: Germany
- Number of employees: 62.400 (2024-06-30)
- Website: www.deutsche-rentenversicherung.de

The Deutsche Rentenversicherung (DRV) (en: German Pension Insurance) is the system of 16 carriers of the state pension insurance in Germany. Though it isn't an institution in its own right, it is a key component within Germany's social security system. It is set out according to the rules of the Sozialgesetzbuch (SGB), with all employees in Germany subject to the state pension insurance being mandatorily insured by DRV. The DRV offers its pension contributors and pensioners a variety of services, including the disbursement of different types of pensions, medical rehabilitation services and advisory services. Fundamental and cross-cutting duties, such as public relations, research, statistics and the common affairs of all pension insurance carriers are carried out by the Deutsche Rentenversicherung Bund. By the end of 2023, the DRV counted 58.5 million insured and 21.4 million pensioners by mid-year 2024; in 2024, it spent 403 billion euros on expenditures, including 360 billion euros on pension payments.

== History ==
The mandatory state insurance in Germany began in 1889 with the "Law regarding infirmity and old age insurance" (Gesetz betreffend die Invaliditäts- und Altersversicherung). Precursor organisations of the Deutsche Rentenversicherung and their respective responsibilities included the following:

- Federal Insurance Institute for Employees (BfA, Bundesversicherungsanstalt für Angestellte): insurance of employees
- 22 state-level insurance institutes (LVA, Landesversicherungsanstalt): insurance of labourers and artisans
- Federal Miners' Association (Bundesknappschaft): insurance of workers in the mining sectors
- Sea Insurance (Seekasse): insurance of seamen
- Train Insurance Institute (Bahnversicherungsanstalt): insurance of train and railway workers

Beyond these, while formally the responsibility of the BfA, independent artists and publishers had their pension insurances managed by the Artists' Social Insurance (Künstlersozialkasse) as a special department of the Federal Accident Insurance (Unfallkasse des Bundes). Within this system, the Association of Pension Insurance Carriers (VDR, Verband Deutscher Rentenversicherungsträger) acted as overarching association and was responsible, among else, for managing the computing centre of the pension insurance (DSRV, Datenstelle der Rentenversicherung) in Würzburg.

Due to changes in the world of work, the initially small share of insured employees rapidly increased and ultimately exceeded the number of insured categorized as labourers, resulting in large differences between the numbers of insured and pensions of the pension insurance for employees and labourers. To address this discrepancy, the 1992 social insurance reform unified the different regulations concerning employees, labourers and miners and ended the distinction between labourers and employees. In 2005, the BfA and VDR were fused into the DRV Bund and the number of regional insurance institutes reduced, while the Federal Miners' Association, Sea Insurance and Train Insurance Institute were aggregated to the DRV Knappschaft-Bahn-See (DRV KBS). Following these reforms, the objective is for regional carriers to care for 55 % of the insured, the DRV Bund to care for 40 % of the insured and the DRV KBS to be responsible for 5 % of the insured, as a means to distribute the burden of insurance administration among the DRV carriers.

== Organisation ==
The organisation of the DRV is characterized by the principle of self-administration (Selbstverwaltung), which refers to the situation wherein an administrative institution (a DRV carrier) performs administrative tasks attributed to it by an administration carrier (e.g., the federal state) without having to follow the attributing organisation's directives or being subject to its administrative or operational oversight; by contrast, the attributing organisation may retain the responsibility of judicial oversight.

Central decisions regarding fundamental and cross-cutting responsibilities are prepared by an expanded directory and are performed by organisational units within DRV Bund. These units consist of members from the self-administrations of all DRV carriers and are therefore representative of these.

The Deutsche Rentenversicherung consists of 16 legally autonomous insurance carriers, which are either active at the national level (federal carrier) or at the regional level (regional carrier). In 2024, approximately 62,400 employees were employed within the Deutsche Rentenversicherung.

=== List of DRV carriers ===
Carriers of the Deutschen Rentenversicherung
Pension insurance carrier	Insured persons on 31.12.2022	Pension payments disbursed in 2023 (rounded in million euros)
Deutsche Rentenversicherung Bund	24,053,878	11.8 mn
Deutsche Rentenversicherung Knappschaft-Bahn-See	2,364,873	1.6 mn
Deutsche Rentenversicherung Baden-Württemberg	4,287,616	1.4 mn
Deutsche Rentenversicherung Bayern Süd	3,032,065	1.2 mn
Deutsche Rentenversicherung Berlin-Brandenburg	2,387,387	0.8 mn
Deutsche Rentenversicherung Braunschweig-Hannover	2,438,763	0.9 mn
Deutsche Rentenversicherung Hessen	2,322,327	0.7 mn
Deutsche Rentenversicherung Mitteldeutschland	2,663,997	1.5 mn
Deutsche Rentenversicherung Nord	2,400,177	0.9 mn
Deutsche Rentenversicherung Nordbayern	1,719,531	0.9 mn
Deutsche Rentenversicherung Oldenburg-Bremen	68,289	0.2 mn
Deutsche Rentenversicherung Rheinland	3,641,154	1.3 mn
Deutsche Rentenversicherung Rheinland-Pfalz	1,595,026	0.6 mn
Deutsche Rentenversicherung Saarland	390,064	0.2 mn
Deutsche Rentenversicherung Schwaben	951,176	0.6 mn
Deutsche Rentenversicherung Westfalen	3,037,910	1.2 mn
gesamte Deutsche Rentenversicherung	57,972,233	25.9 mn

== Finance ==
The social pension system is based on disbursements based on a combination of assets accumulated by some precursor organisations, insurance fees from the insured, and tax subsidies. The tax subsidies are justified by the pension insurance carriers' mandate to provide services beyond the scope of insurance. In 2023, the overall revenue of the DRV amounted to 381 billion euros, consisting of 290 billion euros of revenue and 84 billion euros of federal subsidies. By contrast, expenditures amounted to 380 billion euros, with ca. 90% of expenditures due to pension payments. A further 27 billion euros of expenditures were spent on the health insurance payments for pensioners, which are considered non-insurance benefits.

== See also ==
- Pensions in Germany
