= Huayra GNU/Linux =

Linux distribution

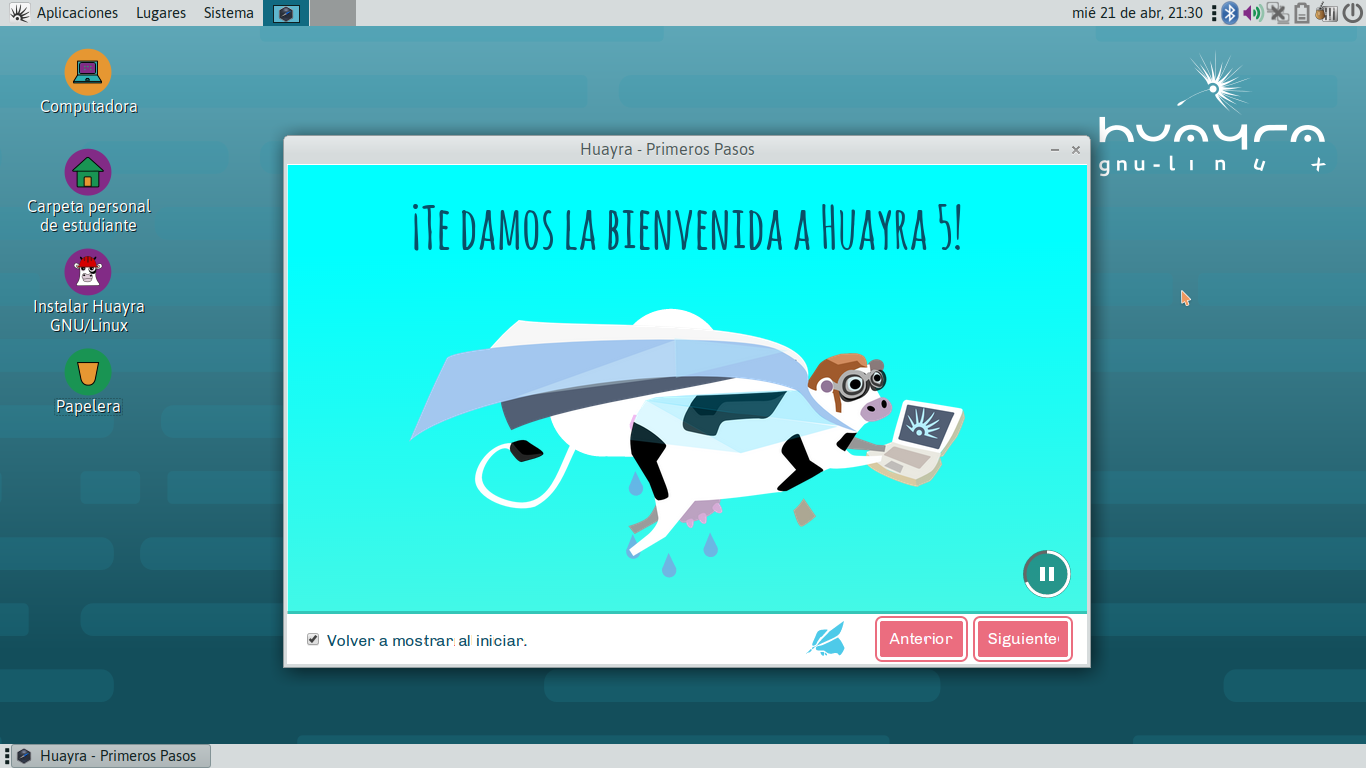
- Screenshot of Huayra GNU/Linux 5.0
- Developer: Currently: Educ.ar - Previously: Conectar Igualdad / ANSES / CENITAL
- OS family: Linux (Unix-like)
- Working state: Discontinued
- Source model: Open source
- Initial release: 1 August 2012 (13 years ago)
- Latest release: 6.5
- Available in: Spanish (Argentina)
- Update method: APT
- Package manager: dpkg
- Kernel type: Monolithic (Linux)
- Default user interface: MATE Desktop
- License: Free software licenses (mainly GPL)
- Official website: huayra.educar.gob.ar

Huayra GNU/Linux is a Linux distribution developed by the Argentine national government. It is based on the Debian architecture. In 2013, it was installed on netbooks that were distributed to schools nationally by the Connect Equality (Conectar Igualdad) program run by ANSES, the original developer of Huayra.

Having been released in the GNU GPL license, Huayra is free software.

== Software developed by the Huayra team ==
The Huayra team develops educational applications designed for students and teachers. There are also other applications that, while not educational, are designed for young kids.

== Theme ==
"The Huayra desktop presents a unique design. Every version of Huayra comes with a unique theme, the latest being "Liso", which includes a GRUB theme, Plymouth, icon pack, GTK2 and GTK3 application themes, window theme, MDM login manager, wallpapers and screensavers, which improve the user experience with Docky and Synapse".

There are various themes like Verde, Mayo or Limbo.

== Versions ==
This table shows all of the different versions of Huayra.

Version number	Codename	Date	Architecture	Support	Note
0.*	pruebas	1 August 2012	i386	*	Development version made for testing.
1.0	brisa	10 March 2013	i386	*	First released version.
1.1	brisa	14 June 2013	i386	*	Update.
2.0	pampero	24 April 2014	i386	*	Second version.
2.1	pampero	13 August 2014	i386	*	Update.
2.2	pampero	22 November 2014	i386 and x86_64	*	Update. First version optimized for 64 bit processors.
3.0	sud	17 March 2015	i386 and x86_64	*	Third version. Based on Debian 8.2
3.1	sud	21 September 2015	i368 and x86_64	*	Update.
3.2	sud	15 March 2016	i386 and x86_64	*	Update. Based on Debian 8.3
4.0	zonda	–	i386 and x86_64	*	Released. Based on Debian 9
5.0	austral	24 April 2021	x86_64	*	Released. Based on Debian 10 (up to 10.13)
6.0	norte	12 June 2023	x86_64	*	Released. Based on Debian 11
6.5	ráfaga	1 February 2024	x86_64	*	Released. Based on Debian 12

Color	Meaning
Red	Old version, no longer supported.
Yellow	Old version, still supported.
Green	Current version.
Blue	In development.

Huayra 6 «norte»

Released on June 12, 2023. Based on Debian 11.5 «Bullseye» and a few improvements. Along with a new version of «Huayra Motion» (that includes the ability to connect USB cameras), and its own software store, among others. There was also added a manual called "El libro vivo de hechizos de Huayra Linux"

== See also ==
- Free Software Foundation
- Linux
- Debian GNU/Linux
- Canaima GNU/Linux
