= Open-Xchange =

Web-based office productivity software suite

- Developer: Open-Xchange AG
- Release: 2005
- Stable release: 8.33.5 / 5 September 2025; 13 months ago
- Operating system: SLES, RHEL, Debian, Univention Corporate Server, CentOS
- Type: Web desktop
- License: Community Edition: GNU AGPL v3.0
- Website: www.open-xchange.com
- Repository: gitlab.open-xchange.com/frontend/core

Open-Xchange is an open source web-based office productivity software suite.

== History ==
Founded in 2005 by Rafael Laguna and Frank Hoberg, the software was released in December of the same year, and started as a Linux-based email and groupware program that was positioned as open-source alternative to Microsoft Exchange.

Andreas Gauger took over as CEO of Open-Xchange AG in May 2020.

== Overview ==
The software includes a set of applications for email, contacts, calendars, media and documents. It integrates message streams from Google Mail, Hotmail, Facebook, Twitter and LinkedIn, and can be used as an alternative with integrated functionality similar to Microsoft Exchange Server and Office 365.

In February 2014, file syncing and collaboration features have been added to the OX App Suite family.

In September 2014, the company introduced a tool called OX Guard to their existing open source email server. Individuals and businesses can use the software to operate their own email services. In July 2015 PGP support has been announced for OX Guard.
