= Nextcloud =

Free and open-source file hosting software suite

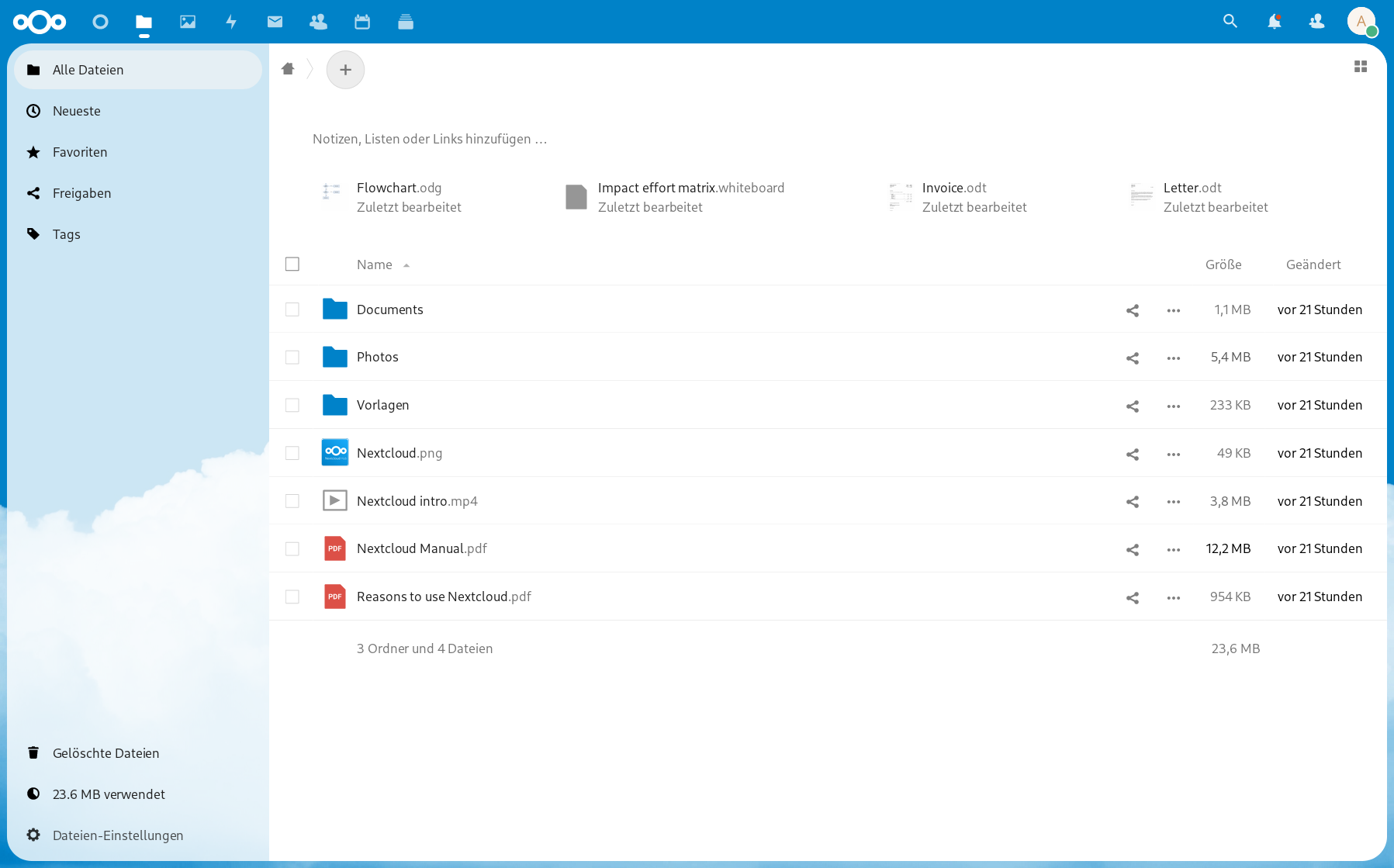
- Nextcloud file manager
- Developers: Nextcloud GmbH., Community
Stable release
- Server: 35.0.3 / 12 November 2026
- Android: 35.0.2 / 28 October 2026
- iOS: 35.2.0 / 21 October 2026
- Desktop: 35.0.3 / 5 November 2026
- Written in: PHP, JavaScript
- Operating system: Server: Linux; Clients: Windows, macOS, Linux, FreeBSD, Android, iOS
- Available in: 100+ languages
- Type: Online storage, data synchronization, Collaboration, video conferencing, Groupware
- Licence: AGPL-3.0-only
- Website: nextcloud.com
- Repository: github.com/nextcloud/server

Nextcloud is a modular workspace platform designed to provide teams and businesses with a comprehensive environment for digital collaboration.

Beyond central data management, it integrates office suites like Collabora Online and EuroOffice for cooperative workflows. The platform features built-in tools for messaging, video-conferencing, and a privacy-focused AI assistant capable of running entirely on local LLMs. It can be hosted in the cloud or on premises, and can scale up to millions of users. It has been translated into over 100 languages.

== Features ==
Nextcloud files are stored in conventional directory structures, accessible via WebDAV if necessary. A SQLite, MySQL/MariaDB or PostgreSQL database is required to provide additional functionality like permissions, shares, and comments.

Nextcloud can synchronize with local clients running Windows (Windows 8.1 and above), macOS (10.14 or later), Linux and FreeBSD. Nextcloud permits user and group administration locally or via different backends like OpenID or LDAP. Content can be shared inside the system by defining granular read/write permissions between users and groups. Nextcloud users can create public URLs when sharing files.

Logging of file-related actions, as well as disallowing access based on file access rules is also available.

Security options like brute-force protection and multi-factor authentication using TOTP, WebAuthn, Oauth2, and OpenID Connect are available.

Nextcloud has planned new features such as monitoring capabilities, full-text search and Kerberos authentication, as well as audio/video conferencing, expanded federation and smaller user interface improvements.

== History ==
In April 2016 Frank Karlitschek and most core contributors left ownCloud Inc. These included some of ownCloud's staff according to sources near to the ownCloud community. Karlitschek and many of these contributors went on to fork ownCloud, creating Nextcloud.

The fork was preceded by a blog post of Karlitschek announcing his departure and raising questions about the management of the ownCloud, its community, and priorities between growth, money, and sustainability. There have been no official statements about the reason for the fork. However, Karlitschek mentioned the fork several times in a talk at the 2018 FOSDEM conference and in two appearances on the FLOSS Weekly podcast, emphasizing cultural mismatch between open source developers and business oriented people not used to the open source community.

On June 2, within 12 hours of the announcement of the fork, the American entity "ownCloud Inc." announced that it is shutting down with immediate effect, stating that "[...] main lenders in the US have cancelled our credit. Following American law, we are forced to close the doors of ownCloud, Inc. with immediate effect and terminate the contracts of 8 employees." ownCloud Inc. accused Karlitschek of poaching developers, while Nextcloud developers such as Arthur Schiwon stated that he "decided to quit because not everything in the ownCloud Inc. company world evolved as I imagined". ownCloud GmbH continued operations, secured financing from new investors and took over the business of ownCloud Inc.

In April 2018 Informationstechnikzentrum Bund (ITZBund) reported Nextcloud won the tender for "Bundescloud" (Germany government cloud) project.

In August 2019 it was announced that the governments of France, Sweden and the Netherlands would use Nextcloud for file transfer.

In January 2020 Nextcloud 18 "Nextcloud Hub" was released. The major change was direct integration with an Office suite (OnlyOffice) and Nextcloud announced that their goal was to compete with Office 365 and Google Docs. A partnership with Ionos was revealed – its hosting location in Germany and compliance with GDPR should support the goal of data sovereignty.

In spring 2020 remote work and web conferencing usage increased due to the COVID-19 pandemic and Nextcloud released version 19 with chat and videoconferencing Talk app integrated into the application core. Communication with an optional "high performance back-end" allows self-hosting of web conferences with more than 10 participants. Collabora Online was introduced as another integrated office suite.

In August 2021 Nextcloud was chosen as a collaboration platform for European cloud software GAIA-X.

In a September 2021 European Commission report it was mentioned as "the most widely deployed Open Source content collaboration platform"

Following the 2025 United States tariffs against the European Union, fear of overreliance on US cloud providers such as Microsoft 365 and Google Workspace increased, with Nextcloud being one of the foremost contenders to replace them. Some governmental organisations including the European Data Protection Supervisor and the German state of Schleswig-Holstein have since switched from Microsoft's Sharepoint to Nextcloud. According to Nextcloud, during the first 5 months of 2025, customer interest in the software had tripled.

In 2026, OnlyOffice suspended their partnership with Nextcloud following a licensing dispute over the announcement of Euro-Office. The same year, Nextcloud announced that it wants to grow its app store from 600 to 6000 apps, and shortly after Tuta announced the launch of its secure email and calendar apps on the Nextcloud App Store.

== Limitations ==
Nextcloud has a 'fair use policy' that a paid subscription for the Enterprise Edition is required for deploying instances with more than 500 users, or infrastructure components like notifications and the app store will be "limited" or not work. For non-profits, small schools, NGO's, "special offers" are possible.

== See also ==
- Seafile (FOSS client-server software for file storage and transfer)
- Comparison of file hosting services
- Comparison of file synchronization software
- Comparison of online backup services
