= Comparison of Office Open XML software =

The Office Open XML format (OOXML), is an open and free document file format for saving and exchanging editable office documents such as text documents (including memos, reports, and books), spreadsheets, charts, and presentations.

The following tables list applications supporting a version of the Office Open XML standard (ECMA-376 and ISO/IEC 29500:2008).

== Text documents ==
=== Word processors ===
| | Version | Operating systems | Office suite | Developer | License | ECMA-376 | ISO/IEC 29500:2008 | Notes |
|---|---|---|---|---|---|---|---|---|
| AbiWord | 2.6.0, 2.6.5 | Windows, Mac OS X, Linux, Unix | | AbiSource | GPL | Yes | | |
| Adobe Buzzword | beta 3, build 600113 | Web application | Standalone | Adobe Systems | Proprietary | Yes | | Limited support |
| Atlantis Word Processor | 1.6.3+ | Windows | Standalone | Rising Sun Solutions | Proprietary | Yes | | |
| Butler Office Pro X | 2.2.0 | Mac OS X | Butler Office Pro X | Butler Software Solutions | Proprietary | Yes | | Full support via email |
| Collabora Office | All versions | Windows, macOS, Linux, Android, iOS, iPadOS, ChromeOS | Collabora Office | Collabora | MPL | Yes | Yes | |
| Collabora Online | All versions | Web application | Collabora Online | Collabora | MPL | Yes | Yes | |
| DataViz Word To Go | 11.000 | Palm OS, Windows Mobile, Symbian (UIQ, S80) | Documents To Go | DataViz | Proprietary | Yes | | |
| EIOffice Word Processor | 2009, 5.0.1272.101 | Windows, Linux | EIOffice | Evermore Software | Proprietary | Yes | | Import only |
| Go-oo Writer (discontinued) | 3.0.0 | Windows, Linux, Unix, Mac OS X | Go-oo | Free software community | LGPL, CDDL | Yes | | Import only Go-oo discontinued in favour of LibreOffice |
| Google Docs | (current) | Web application | Google Docs | Google | Proprietary | Yes | | |
| IBM Lotus Symphony | 1.3 | Windows, Mac OS X, Linux | IBM Lotus Symphony | IBM | Proprietary | Yes | | Import only |
| Ichitaro | 2008 | Windows, Linux | Standalone | JustSystems | Proprietary | Yes | | |
| Jarte | 3.0+ | Windows | Standalone | Carolina Road Software | Proprietary | Yes | | Import only |
| Kingsoft Office Writer | 2009 6.3.0.1733 | Windows | Kingsoft Office | Kingsoft | Proprietary | Yes | | Import only beta support |
| LibreOffice | All versions | Windows, OS X, Linux, Unix | LibreOffice | The Document Foundation | MPL | Yes | Yes | |
| Microsoft Office OneNote | 2007 | Windows | Microsoft Office | Microsoft | Proprietary | Yes | | Export only |
| Microsoft Office Publisher | 2013 | Windows | Microsoft Office | Microsoft | Proprietary | Yes | | |
| Microsoft Office Word | 2013, 2011 for Mac | Windows, Mac OS X | Microsoft Office | Microsoft | Proprietary | Yes | Yes | |
| Microsoft Office Mobile Word Mobile | 6.1 | Windows Mobile | Microsoft Office Mobile | Microsoft | Proprietary | Yes | | |
| Microsoft Works Word Processor | 9 | Windows | Microsoft Works | Microsoft | Proprietary | Yes | Yes | |
| NeoOffice Writer discontinued | 2.2.1 | Mac OS X | NeoOffice | Patrick Luby and Edward Peterlin | GPL | Yes | | |
| Nisus Writer Pro | 1.2 | Mac OS X v10.4 or later | Standalone | Nisus Software, Inc. | Proprietary | Yes | | |
| ONLYOFFICE | 5.2 | Web application | ONLYOFFICE | Ascensio System SIA | Proprietary, AGPL | Yes | | |
| OpenOffice Writer | 3.0 | Windows, Linux, Unix, Mac OS X | OpenOffice.org | Apache OpenOffice | LGPL | Yes | | Import only |
| OpenXML Writer | 1.0 | Windows | Standalone | OpenXML.biz | Ms-RL | Yes | | |
| Pages | '08 | Mac OS X | iWork | Apple Inc. | Proprietary | Yes | | |
| StarOffice Writer | 9 | Windows, Linux, Solaris | StarOffice | Sun Microsystems | Proprietary | Yes | | Import only |
| TextEdit | starting with Mac OS X v10.5 | Mac OS X | Standalone | Apple Inc. | BSD 3-clause | Yes | | Bundled with Mac OS X, which yields limited support |
| TextMaker | 2010 | Windows, Linux, Windows Mobile, Windows CE, Android | SoftMaker Office | SoftMaker Software GmbH | Proprietary | Yes | | |
| Thinkfree Office Write | | Windows, Mac OS X, Linux | Thinkfree Office | ThinkFree Corp | Proprietary | Yes | | |
| WordPerfect | X4 (2008) | Windows | Corel WordPerfect Office X4 | Corel | Proprietary | Yes | | Import only |
| Zoho Writer | (current) | Web application | Zoho Office Suite | AdventNet Inc. | Proprietary | Yes | | |
| | Version | Operating systems | Office suite | Developer | License | ECMA-376 | ISO/IEC 29500:2008 | Notes |

=== Other applications ===
Besides word processors, other programs can and do support the Office Open XML text format. See the list of software that supports Office Open XML for more.

== Spreadsheet documents ==
| | Version | Operating systems | Office suite | Developer | License | ECMA-376 | ISO/IEC 29500:2008 | Notes |
|---|---|---|---|---|---|---|---|---|
| Collabora Office | All versions | Windows, macOS, Linux, Android, iOS, iPadOS, ChromeOS | Collabora Office | Collabora | MPL | Yes | Yes | |
| Collabora Online | All versions | Web application | Collabora Online | Collabora | MPL | Yes | Yes | |
| DataViz Sheet To Go | 11.000 | Palm OS, Windows Mobile, Symbian (UIQ, S80) | Documents To Go | DataViz | Proprietary | Yes | | |
| EIOffice Spreadsheet | 2009, 5.0.1272.101 | Windows, Linux | EIOffice | Evermore Software | Proprietary | Yes | | Import only |
| Gnumeric | 1.8 | Linux, Unix, Windows | | GNOME | GPL | Yes | | Incomplete support |
| Go-oo Calc | 3.0.0 | Windows, Linux, Unix, Mac OS X | Go-oo | Free software community | LGPL, CDDL | Yes | | Import only |
| Google Docs | (current) | Web application | Google Docs | Google | Proprietary | Yes | | |
| IBM Lotus Symphony | 1.3 | Windows, Mac OS X, Linux | IBM Lotus Symphony | IBM | Proprietary | Yes | | Import only |
| Kingsoft Office Spreadsheets | 2009, 6.3.0.1733 | Windows | Kingsoft Office | Kingsoft | Proprietary | Yes | | Import only beta support |
| LibreOffice | All versions | Windows, macOS, Linux, Unix | LibreOffice | The Document Foundation | MPL | Yes | Yes | |
| Microsoft Office Excel | 2013, 2011 for Mac | Windows, Mac OS X | Microsoft Office | Microsoft | Proprietary | Yes | Yes | |
| Microsoft Office Mobile Excel Mobile | 6.1 | Windows Mobile | Microsoft Office Mobile | Microsoft | Proprietary | Yes | | |
| Microsoft Works Spreadsheet | 9 | Windows | Microsoft Works | Microsoft | Proprietary | Yes | Yes | |
| NeoOffice Calc | 2.2.5 | Mac OS X | NeoOffice | Patrick Luby and Edward Peterlin | GPL | Yes | | |
| Numbers | '08 | Mac OS X | iWork | Apple Inc. | Proprietary | Yes | | |
| ONLYOFFICE | 5.2 | Web application | ONLYOFFICE | Ascensio System SIA | Proprietary, AGPL | Yes | | |
| OpenOffice.org Calc | 3.0 | Windows, Linux, Unix, Mac OS X | OpenOffice.org | OpenOffice.org | LGPL | Yes | | Import only |
| Quattro Pro | X4 (2008) | Windows | WordPerfect Office | Corel | Proprietary | Yes | | Import only |
| StarOffice Calc | 9 | Windows, Linux, Solaris | StarOffice | Sun Microsystems | Proprietary | Yes | | Import only |
| Thinkfree Office Calc | | Windows, Mac OS X, Linux | Thinkfree Office | ThinkFree Corp | Proprietary | Yes | | |
| | Version | Operating systems | Office suite | Developer | License | ECMA-376 | ISO/IEC 29500:2008 | Notes |

== Presentation documents ==
| | Version | Operating systems | Office suite | Developer | License | ECMA-376 | ISO/IEC 29500:2008 | Notes |
|---|---|---|---|---|---|---|---|---|
| Butler Office Pro X | 2.2.0 | Mac OS X | Butler Office Pro X | Butler Software Solutions | Proprietary | Yes | | Full support via email |
| Collabora Office | All versions | Windows, macOS, Linux, Android, iOS, iPadOS, ChromeOS | Collabora Office | Collabora | MPL | Yes | Yes | |
| Collabora Online | All versions | Web application | Collabora Online | Collabora | MPL | Yes | Yes | |
| DataViz Slideshow To Go | 11.000 | Palm OS, Windows Mobile, Symbian (UIQ, S80) | Documents To Go | DataViz | Proprietary | Yes | | |
| EIOffice Presentation | 2009, 5.0.1272.101 | Windows, Linux | EIOffice | Evermore Software | Proprietary | Yes | | Import only |
| Go-oo Impress | 3.0.0 | Windows, Linux, Unix, Mac OS X | Go-oo | Free software community | LGPL, CDDL | Yes | | Import only |
| IBM Lotus Symphony | 1.3 | Windows, Mac OS X, Linux | IBM Lotus Symphony | IBM | Proprietary | Yes | | Import only |
| Keynote | '08 | Mac OS X | iWork | Apple Inc. | Proprietary | Yes | | |
| LibreOffice | All versions | Windows, macOS, Linux, Unix | LibreOffice | The Document Foundation | MPL | Yes | Yes | |
| Microsoft Office PowerPoint | 2013, 2011 for Mac | Windows, Mac OS X | Microsoft Office | Microsoft | Proprietary | Yes | Yes | |
| Microsoft Office Mobile PowerPoint Mobile | 6.1 | Windows Mobile | Microsoft Office Mobile | Microsoft | Proprietary | Yes | | |
| NeoOffice Impress | 2.2.5 | Mac OS X | NeoOffice | Patrick Luby, Edward Peterlin | GPL | Yes | | |
| ONLYOFFICE | 5.2 | Web application | ONLYOFFICE | Ascensio System SIA | Proprietary, AGPL | Yes | | |
| OpenOffice.org Impress | 3.0 | Windows, Linux, Unix, Mac OS X | OpenOffice.org | OpenOffice.org | LGPL | Yes | | Import only |
| Corel Presentations | X4 (2008) | Windows | WordPerfect Office | Corel | Proprietary | Yes | | Import only |
| StarOffice Impress | 9 | Windows, Linux, Solaris | StarOffice | Sun Microsystems | Proprietary | Yes | | Import only |
| Thinkfree Office Show | | Windows, Mac OS X, Linux | Thinkfree Office | ThinkFree Corp | Proprietary | Yes | | |
| | Version | Operating systems | Office suite | Developer | License | ECMA-376 | ISO/IEC 29500:2008 | Notes |

== See also ==
- Comparison of office suites
- Comparison of word processors
- Open format
