= List of software that supports Office Open XML =

This is an overview of software support for the Office Open XML format, a document file format for saving and exchanging editable office documents.

The list here is not exhaustive.

== ECMA-376 1st edition implementations ==
The ECMA-376 1st edition Office Open XML standard is supported by a number of applications from various vendors; listed alphabetically they include:

=== Text documents (.docx) ===
==== Word processors ====
- AbiWord includes an input filter for Office Open XML text documents beginning with version 2.6.0. Export of Office Open XML text documents is supported beginning with version 2.6.5.
- Adobe Creative Cloud
- Apache OpenOffice reads some .docx. It does not write .docx.
- Apple Inc.'s iWork '08 suite has read-only support for Office Open XML word processing file formats in Pages.
- Apple Inc.'s iPhone has read-only support for Office Open XML attachments to email.
- Apple Inc.'s TextEdit, the built-in word processing program of Mac OS X, has very basic read and write support for Office Open XML text files starting with Mac OS X v10.5.
- Atlantis Word Processor includes input and export filters for Office Open XML text documents (DOCX) beginning with version 1.6.3.
- Collabora Office enterprise-ready edition of LibreOffice has built-in support for opening and writing Office Open XML files. It is available for Windows, macOS, Linux, Android, iOS, iPadOS and Chromebooks.
- Collabora Online a web-based enterprise-ready edition of LibreOffice word processor and suite has built-in support for opening and writing Office Open XML files. It is available online via html.
- Corel WordPerfect Office X5 can both read and write Office Open XML.
- DataViz' Documents To Go for Android, Palm OS, Windows Mobile and Symbian OS (UIQ, S80) supports Office Open XML documents.
- Evermore Software EIOffice Word Processor has import only Office Open XML support for text documents. It is available for Windows and Linux.
- Google Docs, a web-based word processor and spreadsheet application supports importing Office Open XML text documents. As of June 2014, DOCX files can be edited "natively," without conversion.
- IBM Lotus Symphony includes an input filter for Office Open XML text documents beginning with version 1.3.
- Jarte 3.0+ for Windows has import only Office Open XML support for text documents.
- JustSystems Ichitaro 2008 (Japanese) has built-in support for Office Open XML files. It is available for Windows and Linux.
- LibreOffice has built-in support for opening and writing Office Open XML files. It is available for Windows, macOS, Linux, BSDs, etc.
- MadCap Flare is a Help authoring tool that can generate multiple outputs including Office Open XML text documents, PDF, Clean XHTML output and other formats.
- Microsoft Office 2007, Microsoft Office 2010, and Microsoft Office 2013 for Windows use the Office Open XML format as the default, but is unable to read files from other office tools that use Office Open XML as their format, e.g. SoftMaker Office files.
- Some older versions of Microsoft Word and Microsoft Office (2000, XP and 2003) are able to read and write docx files after installation of the free compatibility pack provided by Microsoft, but some items such as equations are converted into images that cannot be edited. The compatibility pack is available for Windows 2000 Service Pack 4 and newer operating systems. It does not require Microsoft Office but does require Microsoft Windows. It can be used as a standalone converter with products that read Office's older binary formats, such as OpenOffice.org.
- Microsoft Office 2008 for Mac and Microsoft Office for Mac 2011 support the Office Open XML format. For older versions of Office on the Mac, a converter is available.
- Microsoft Office Mobile 6.1 supports Office Open XML on Mobile devices.
- For Microsoft Word, see Microsoft Office above.
- Microsoft's version of Wordpad included with Windows 7 supports opening and saving in the docx format.
- The Mac OS X-based NeoOffice office suite supports opening, editing, and saving of most Office Open XML documents since version 2.1.
- Nisus Writer Pro has built-in, but rather limited, support for opening OOXML documents.
- ONLYOFFICE, an online office suite, can read and write Office Open XML format.
- OpenOffice.org had built-in support for opening Office Open XML text documents beginning with OpenOffice.org version 3.0 (October 2008).
- QuickOffice, a mobile office suite for Symbian and Palm OS, supports wordprocessing in Office Open XML format.
- Schreibchen 1.0.1 for Mac OS X can open and write Office Open XML text documents. It is a very simple word processor for disabled persons, children and other peoples that can not use (or like) other word processors or text editors.
- Schreiben 4.0.1, a simple and fast word processor for Mac OS X supports Office Open XML text documents.
- SoftMaker Office 2016 and 2012, an office suite for Windows, Linux, and Google Android supports .docx, .xlsx, and .pptx in its word processor, spreadsheet and presentation-graphics software respectively. SoftMaker Office 2018 uses Office Open XML as its default file format.
- The online Thinkfree Office supports Office Open XML word processing files.
- WPS Office Writer 2019 (Windows, Linux, Android, iOS and Mac) supports Office Open XML.
- Online word processor Zoho Writer supports exporting to the Office Open XML WordprocessingML format.

==== Viewers, filters and converters ====
- Apple Inc.'s Quick Look, the built-in quick preview feature of Mac OS X, supports Office Open XML files starting with Mac OS X v10.5.
- Collabora Office can also run headless online or locally as a filter and converter for Office Open XML files. It will do this under Windows, macOS, Linux.
- Collabora Online a web-based word processor and suite has built-in support for Office Open XML files. It can be embedded into html applications for viewers, filters and converters.
- DataViz MacLinkPlus Deluxe 16 supports Office Open XML file formats.
- Google Search supports direct HTML view of Office Open XML files. Found files can be viewed directly in a converted HTML view.
- Microsoft Office Open XML Converter for Mac OS X can convert Office Open XML files to the former binary file formats used in older versions of Microsoft Office.
- NativeWinds Docx2Rtf supports Office Open XML text documents.
- SoftMaker TextMaker Viewer 2009 is a free application that supports viewing and printing of documents in many word processing formats including Office Open XML text documents.

==== Translation support ====
- OmegaT – OmegaT is a free translation memory application written in Java.
- Swordfish Translation Editor, a cross-platform CAT tool based on XLIFF 1.2 open standard published by OASIS that provides support for translation of Office Open XML files.

==== Bibliographic ====
- RefWorks – Web-based commercial citation manager, supports uploading DOCX files for citation formatting.

==== Programmatic support ====
- Apache POI supports Office Open XML as of the 3.5 release.
- Aspose.Words - Aspose supports Office Open XML formats for word processing documents for developers through Aspose.Words API.
- Text Control TX Text Control, a family of reusable wordprocessing components for developers support reading and writing of Office Open XML wordprocessing files.
- Zend Framework 1.7 provides a PHP search engine that allows searching information from within Office Open XML files.

==== Other products ====
- Altova DiffDog supports detailed differencing for Office Open XML and ZIP archive file pairs.
- Altova StyleVision adds Word 2007 (Office Open XML) wordprocessing capabilities to its graphical stylesheet design tool.
- Altova XMLSpy, an XML editor for modeling, editing, transforming, and debugging XML technologies has capabilities for accessing, editing, transforming, and querying Office Open XML file formats.
- IBM Db2 Content Manager V8.4 clients support Office Open XML file formats.
- IBM Lotus Notes 8.0.2+ supports Office Open XML text documents.
- IBM Lotus Quickr V8.0 includes support for Office Open XML documents.
- IBM WebSphere Portal supports Office Open XML text documents.
- IBM WebSphere Business Modeler supports Office Open XML text documents.
- Mindjet MindManager supports the Office Open XML format.
- Nuance OmniPage Professional 16, an OCR and Document Conversion Software, was the first desktop OCR application to provide native support for the Office Open XML standard.
- Oxygen XML Editor provides ready to use validation, editing and processing support for Office Open XML files. These capabilities allow developers to use data from office documents together with validation and transformations (using XSLT or XQuery) to other file formats. Validation is done using the latest ECMA-376 XML Schemas.
- RIM BlackBerry Enterprise Server software version 4.1 SP4 (4.1.4) supports Office Open XML file formats.
- Serif PagePlus X3 – Desktop publishing (page layout) program for Windows includes an Office Open XML text import filter.

==== Planned and beta software ====
- Haansoft's Hangul Word Processor will support reading and writing of Office Open XML documents in its next version for Windows, which will be published in the end of 2009.
- SoftMaker's TextMaker (part of SoftMaker Office) will support Office Open XML text documents in upcoming versions.
- Unified Office Format (UOF) Open Source Translator is being developed by Beihang University and partners to convert from Office Open XML to UOF and vice versa.

=== Spreadsheet documents (.xlsx) ===
==== Spreadsheet software ====
- 280 North, Inc.'s 280 Slides is a web-based presentation app which can import and export the Office Open XML presentation format, though does not implement all of the features of the specification.
- Apache OpenOffice reads some .xlsx. It does not write .xlsx.
- Apple Inc.'s iWork '08 suite has read-only support for Office Open XML spreadsheet file formats in Numbers.
- Apple Inc.'s iPhone has read-only support for Office Open XML attachments to email.
- Collabora Office enterprise-ready edition of LibreOffice has built-in support for opening and writing Office Open XML files. It is available for Windows, macOS, Linux, Android, iOS, iPadOS and Chromebooks.
- Collabora Online a web-based enterprise-ready edition of LibreOffice word processor and suite has built-in support for opening and writing Office Open XML files. It is available online via html.
- Corel WordPerfect Office X4 includes import-only support for Office Open XML.
- DataViz' Documents To Go for Android, Palm OS, Windows Mobile and Symbian OS (UIQ, S80) supports Office Open XML documents.
- Datawatch supports Office Open XML spreadsheets in its report mining tool Monarch v9.0.
- Gnumeric has limited SpreadsheetML support.
- Google Sheets, a web-based spreadsheet application can import and export Office Open XML spreadsheet documents. As of June 2014, users of the Google Sheets app (for Android) or the Chrome browser can edit .xlsx files directly.
- IBM Lotus Symphony includes an input filter for Office Open XML spreadsheet documents beginning with version 1.3.
- JustSystems JUST Suite 2009 Sanshiro (Japanese) for Windows supports Office Open XML spreadsheet documents.
- LibreOffice has built-in support for reading and writing Office Open XML files. It is available for Windows, macOS, Linux, etc.
- Microsoft Office 2007, Microsoft Office 2010, and Microsoft Office 2013 for Windows use the Office Open XML format as the default.
- Older versions of Microsoft Office (2000, XP and 2003) require a free compatibility pack provided by Microsoft. It is available for Windows 2000 Service Pack 4 and newer operating systems. The compatibility pack does not require Microsoft Office, but does require Microsoft Windows. It can be used as a standalone converter with products that read Office's older binary formats, such as OpenOffice.org.
- Microsoft Office 2008 for Mac and Microsoft Office for Mac 2011 support the Office Open XML format. For older versions of Office on the Mac, a converter is available.
- Microsoft Office Mobile 6.1 supports Office Open XML on Mobile devices.
- The Mac OS X-based NeoOffice office suite supports opening, editing, and saving of most Office Open XML documents since version 2.1.
- ONLYOFFICE, an online office suite, can read and write Office Open XML format.
- OpenOffice.org read .docx beginning with OpenOffice.org version 3.0 (October 2008).
- QuickOffice, a mobile office suite for Symbian and Palm OS, supports spreadsheets in Office Open XML format.
- The online Thinkfree Office will support Office Open XML spreadsheets and presentation files in the future.
- WPS Office Spreadsheets 2019 (Windows, Linux, Android, iOS and Mac) supports Office Open XML.

==== Viewers, filters and converters ====
- Apple Inc.'s Quick Look, the built-in quick preview feature of Mac OS X, supports Office Open XML files starting with Mac OS X v10.5.
- Collabora Office can also run headless online or locally as a filter and converter for Office Open XML files. It will do this under Windows, macOS, Linux.
- Collabora Online a web-based word processor and suite has built-in support for Office Open XML files. It can be embedded into html applications for viewers, filters and converters.
- DataViz MacLinkPlus Deluxe 16 supports Office Open XML file formats.
- Google Search supports direct HTML view of Office Open XML files. Found files can be viewed directly in a converted HTML view.
- Microsoft Office Open XML Converter for Mac OS X can convert Office Open XML files to the former binary file formats used in older versions of Microsoft Office.
- OxygenOffice includes xmlfilter which is the code that OpenOffice.org 3 will use to process Office Open XML files, and xmlfilter is completely different from OdfConverter. This filter, however, is only for importing Office Open XML files not for exporting them.

==== Translation support ====
- OmegaT – OmegaT is a free translation memory application written in Java.
  - OmegaT+ – Free computer assisted translation tools platform Cross-platform (Java).

==== Programmatic support ====
- Apache POI supports Office Open XML as of the 3.5 release.
- Excelize provides a Go open-source library that allows writing and reading within Office Open XML files.
- Zend Framework 1.7 provides a PHP search engine that allows searching information from within Office Open XML files.

==== Other products ====
- Altova XMLSpy, an XML editor for modeling, editing, transforming, and debugging XML technologies provides capabilities for accessing, editing, transforming, and querying Office Open XML file formats.
- IBM Db2 Content Manager V8.4 clients support Office Open XML file formats.
- IBM Lotus Notes 8.0.2+ supports Office Open XML spreadsheet documents.
- IBM Lotus Quickr V8.0 includes support for Office Open XML documents.
- IBM WebSphere Portal supports Office Open XML spreadsheet documents.
- Mindjet MindManager supports the Office Open XML format.
- Nuance OmniPage Professional 16, an OCR and Document Conversion Software, was the first desktop OCR application to provide native support for the Office Open XML standard.
- Oxygen XML Editor provides ready to use validation, editing and processing support for Office Open XML files. These capabilities allow developers to use data from office documents together with validation and transformations (using XSLT or XQuery) to other file formats. Validation is done using the latest ECMA-376 XML Schemas.
- RIM BlackBerry Enterprise Server software version 4.1 SP4 (4.1.4) supports Office Open XML file formats.

=== Presentation documents (.pptx) ===
==== Presentation software ====
- Apache OpenOffice reads some .pptx. It does not write .pptx.
- Apple Inc.'s iWork '08 suite has read-only support for Office Open XML presentation file formats in Keynote.
- Apple Inc.'s iPhone has read-only support for Office Open XML attachments to email.
- Collabora Office enterprise-ready edition of LibreOffice has built-in support for opening and writing Office Open XML files. It is available for Windows, macOS, Linux, Android, iOS, iPadOS and Chromebooks.
- Collabora Online a web-based enterprise-ready edition of LibreOffice word processor and suite has built-in support for opening and writing Office Open XML files. It is available online via html.
- Corel WordPerfect Office X4 includes import-only support for Office Open XML.
- DataViz' Documents To Go for Android, Palm OS, Windows Mobile and Symbian OS (UIQ, S80) supports Office Open XML documents.
- Google Slides, a web-based slideware application can import and export Office Open XML presentation documents. As of June 2014, users of the Google Slides app (for Android) or the Chrome browser can edit .pptx files directly.
- IBM Lotus Symphony includes an input filter for Office Open XML presentation documents beginning with version 1.3.
- JustSystems JUST Suite 2009 Agree (Japanese) for Windows supports Office Open XML presentation documents.
- LibreOffice has built-in support for reading and writing Office Open XML files. It is available for Windows, macOS, Linux, etc.
- Microsoft Office 2007, Microsoft Office 2010, and Microsoft Office 2013 for Windows use the Office Open XML format as the default.
- Older versions of Microsoft Office (2000, XP and 2003) require a free compatibility pack provided by Microsoft. It is available for Windows 2000 Service Pack 4 and newer operating systems. The compatibility pack does not require Microsoft Office, but does require Microsoft Windows. It can be used as a standalone converter with products that read Office's older binary formats, such as OpenOffice.org.
- Microsoft Office 2008 for Mac and Microsoft Office for Mac 2011 support the Office Open XML format. For older versions of Office on the Mac, a converter is available.
- Microsoft Office Mobile 6.1 supports Office Open XML on Mobile devices.
- The Mac OS X-based NeoOffice office suite supports opening, editing, and saving of most Office Open XML documents since version 2.1.
- OnlyOffice, an online office suite, can read and write Office Open XML format.
- OpenOffice.org read .pptx beginning with OpenOffice.org version 3.0 (October 2008).
- The online Thinkfree Office will support Office Open XML spreadsheets and presentation files in the future.
- WPS Office, presentation 2019 (Windows, Linux, Android, iOS and Mac) supports Office Open XML.
- Zoho Show, is an online collaborative presentation software that is compatible with ppt, pps, odp, sxi, pptx, ppsx and potx formats.

==== Viewers, filters and converters ====
- Apple Inc.'s Quick Look, the built-in quick preview feature of Mac OS X, supports Office Open XML files starting with Mac OS X v10.5.
- Collabora Office can also run headless online or locally as a filter and converter for Office Open XML files. It will do this under Windows, macOS, Linux.
- Collabora Online a web-based word processor and suite has built-in support for Office Open XML files. It can be embedded into html applications for viewers, filters and converters.
- DataViz MacLinkPlus Deluxe 16 supports Office Open XML file formats.
- Google Search supports direct HTML view of Office Open XML files. Found files can be viewed directly in a converted HTML view.
- Microsoft Office Open XML Converter for Mac OS X can convert Office Open XML files to the former binary file formats used in older versions of Microsoft Office.
- OxygenOffice includes xmlfilter which is the code that OpenOffice.org 3 will use to process Office Open XML files, and xmlfilter is completely different from OdfConverter. This filter, however, is only for importing Office Open XML files not for exporting them.
- OmegaT – OmegaT is a free translation memory application written in Java.

==== Other products ====
- Altova DiffDog supports detailed differencing for Office Open XML and ZIP archive file pairs.
- Altova XMLSpy, an XML editor for modeling, editing, transforming, and debugging XML technologies provides capabilities for accessing, editing, transforming, and querying Office Open XML file formats.
- IBM Db2 Content Manager V8.4 clients support Office Open XML file formats.
- IBM Lotus Notes 8.0.2+ supports Office Open XML presentation documents.
- IBM Lotus Quickr V8.0 includes support for Office Open XML documents.
- IBM WebSphere Portal supports Office Open XML presentation documents.
- Mindjet MindManager supports the Office Open XML format.
- Nuance OmniPage Professional 16, an OCR and Document Conversion Software, was the first desktop OCR application to provide native support for the Office Open XML standard.
- Oxygen XML Editor provides ready to use validation, editing and processing support for Office Open XML files. These capabilities allow developers to use data from office documents together with validation and transformations (using XSLT or XQuery) to other file formats. Validation is done using the latest ECMA-376 XML Schemas.
- RIM BlackBerry Enterprise Server software version 4.1 SP4 (4.1.4) supports Office Open XML file formats.

==== Planned and beta software ====
- Apache POI will support Office Open XML in the forthcoming 3.5 release, currently still in Beta
- SoftMaker's Presentations (part of SoftMaker Office) will support Office Open XML presentation documents in upcoming versions.
- Unified Office Format (UOF) Open Source Translator is being developed by Beihang University and partners to convert from Office Open XML to UOF and vice versa.

=== Search tools ===
- Google supports searching in content of DOCX, XLSX, and PPTX files and also searching for these filetypes. Found files can be viewed directly in a converted HTML view.
- Apple Spotlight supports indexed searching of Office Open XML files.
- Copernic Desktop Search for Windows supports indexed searching of Office Open XML files.

== ISO/IEC 29500:2008 / ECMA-376 2nd edition implementations ==
=== LibreOffice, Collabora Office and Collabora Online ===
LibreOffice, Collabora Office and Collabora Online have built-in support for Office Open XML files in ISO/IEC 29500 standard. The Collabora suites are enterprise-ready editions of LibreOffice

=== Microsoft Office 2013, 2016, 2019, 2021 and Microsoft 365 ===
Microsoft Office 2013, 2016, 2019, 2021 and Microsoft 365 continue to read and write files that are conformant to ISO/IEC 29500 Transitional by default. Microsoft Office 2013 and later fully support ISO/IEC 29500 Strict, but do not use it as the default file format because of backwards compatibility concerns.

=== Microsoft Office 2010 ===
In 2008, Microsoft stated that Microsoft Office 2010 would be the first version of Microsoft Office to support ISO/IEC 29500. The official release of this version of the product reads and writes files conformant to ISO/IEC 29500 Transitional, and reads files conformant to ISO/IEC 29500 Strict.

=== Microsoft Office 2007 ===
On July 28, 2008, Murray Sargent, a software development engineer in the Microsoft Office team confirmed that Word 2007 will have a service pack release that enables it to read and write ISO standard OOXML files. However, as of Service Pack 2 (released 2009) Microsoft is not claiming Microsoft Office 2007 compatibility with the ISO OOXML standard.

=== Open XML Format SDK ===
Open XML SDK
- Developer: Microsoft
- Release: June 10, 2008; 18 years ago
- Stable release: v2.12.2 / February 16, 2021; 5 years ago
- Written in: C#
- Operating system: Windows, Unix-like
- Platform: .NET Framework, .NET Core, UWP, Mono, Xamarin.iOS, Xamarin.Mac, Xamarin.Android
- Type: Software library
- License: Apache License 2.0
- Website: www.nuget.org/packages/DocumentFormat.OpenXml/
- Repository: github.com/OfficeDev/Open-XML-SDK

Microsoft Open XML Format SDK contains a set of managed code libraries to create and manipulate Office Open XML files programmatically. Version 1.0 was released on June 10, 2008 and incorporates the changes made to the Office Open XML specification made during the current ISO/IEC standardization process. Version 2 of the Open XML SDK supports validating Office Open XML documents against the Office Open XML schema, as well as searching in Office Open XML documents. On March 13, 2008, Doug Mahugh, a senior product manager at Microsoft specializing in Office client interoperability and the Open XML file formats, confirmed that version 1.0 of the Open XML Format SDK "will definitely be 100% compliant with the final ISO/IEC 29500 spec, including the changes accepted at the BRM". In a ComputerWorld interview from 2008, Doug Mahugh said that "Microsoft would continue to update the SDK to make sure that applications built with it remained compliant with an Open XML standard as changes were made in the future". By June 2014, the Open XML SDK was at version 2.5 and had been released as open source under the Apache License 2.0 on GitHub.

== See also ==
- Comparison of Office Open XML software
- Network effect
- Open format
- Office suite
- OpenDocument Format
