= List of office suites =

In computing, an office suite is a collection of productivity software usually containing at least a word processor, spreadsheet and a presentation program. There are many different brands and types of office suites.

== Office suites ==
=== Free and open source suites ===
- AndrOpen Office – available for Android
- Apache OpenOffice – available for Linux, macOS and Windows
- Calligra Suite – available for FreeBSD, Linux, macOS and Windows
- Collabora Online – available for Android, ChromeOS, iOS, iPadOS, Linux, macOS, online and Windows
- LibreOffice – available for Linux, macOS and Windows, and unofficial: Android, ChromeOS, FreeBSD, Haiku, iOS, iPadOS, OpenBSD, NetBSD and Solaris
- Nextcloud – online collaboration suite, available for Android, iOS, Linux, macOS and Windows
- OnlyOffice – available for Android, iOS, Linux, macOS, online and Windows
- OpenDesk – designed for public sector use

=== Freeware and proprietary suites ===
- Ability Office – available for Windows
- Apple Creator Studio – available for iOS, iPadOS, macOS, tvOS, watchOS, visionOS and online
- Google Workspace – available for Android, ChromeOS, iOS, iPadOS, Linux, macOS, online and Windows
- Google Docs Editors – available for Android, ChromeOS, iOS, iPadOS, Linux, macOS, online and Windows
- Hancom Office – available for Windows
- Ichitaro – a Japanese-language suite available for Windows
- iWork – available for iOS, iPadOS, macOS, tvOS, watchOS, visionOS and online
- Lark – available for iOS, iPadOS, macOS, online, Windows, and Android
- Microsoft Office/365 – available for Android, iOS, iPadOS, macOS, online and Windows
- MobiOffice – available for Android, iOS and Windows
- Polaris Office – available for iOS, macOS and Windows
- SoftMaker Office – available for Android, iOS, iPadOS, Linux, macOS and Windows
- Tiki Wiki CMS Groupware – online content management
- WordPerfect Office – available for Windows
- WPS Office – available for Android, iOS, macOS, Linux and Windows
- Zoho Office Suite

== Discontinued office suites ==
- AppleWorks
- Aster*x
- AUIS – an office suite developed by Carnegie Mellon University and named after Andrew Carnegie
- Breadbox Office – DOS software
- Corel WordPerfect for DOS
- EasyOffice
- Gobe Productive – integrated office software for BeOS (later also for Windows)
- Hancom Office Suite (formerly ThinkFree Office)
- IBM Lotus SmartSuite
- IBM Lotus Symphony
- IBM Works – an office suite for the IBM OS/2 operating system
- Interleaf
- Jambo OpenOffice, an abandoned project to translate the OpenOffice.org project into Swahili
- Lotus Jazz – Mac sister product to Lotus Symphony
- Lotus Symphony
- Microsoft Works
- NeoOffice – available for macOS
- Picsel Smart Office
- QuickOffice
- Siag Office
- Sim desk – online office suite from Simdesk Technologies, Inc
- StarOffice – continued as open source suite OpenOffice.org then LibreOffice

== See also ==
- Comparison of office suites
- List of word processors
- List of spreadsheets
- List of presentation programs
