= Truebil =

Online car market in India

- Company type: Public
- Website type: Online marketplace for trading used cars
- Founders: Shubh Bansal; Himanshu Singhal; Rakesh Raman; Suraj Kalwani; Shanu Vivek; Ravi Chirania; Ritesh Pandey
- Website: truebil.com

Truebil.com is a Mumbai-based company, which operates virtual marketplace for trading used cars in Mumbai, Bangalore and Delhi, along with a retail vertical called Truebil Direct. Launched on 13 March 2015. Truebil uses artificial intelligence (AI) algorithms to predict the ideal price of used cars based on parameters like the condition of the car, geographical factors, and seasonal factors.

== History ==
Truebil was co-founded by seven ex-IITians namely Suraj Kalwani (CEO), Ravi Chirania, Shubh Bansal, Rakesh Raman, Ritesh Pandey, Shanu Vivek, and Himanshu Singhal in 2015.

Truebil has a presence in 4 Indian cities: Delhi, Mumbai, Hyderabad and Bangalore.

== Finance/Funding ==
Kae Capital and angel investor Anupam Mittal invested a sum of $500,000; Kalaari Capital, Inventus Capital and Tekton Ventures pumped $5.15 million as Series-A funding. It has also received an additional $3 million from Shunwei Capital in Follow-on Series A funding. Truebil raised funding from a Japanese firm worth $14M in January 2019. In March 2018 Truebil crossed Rs.100 crore in annualized revenue run rate. In September 2019 it raised $1 million from a Japanese venture capital firm Spiral Ventures.

== Services ==
Truebil's services include valuation, sell guarantees, vehicle buying consulting, paper transfer, loan assistance, and insurance, among others. The platform offers a marketplace of used and refurbished cars from a variety of sources, lets customers buy refurbished cars directly from offline Truebil stores that handle all paperwork related to ownership transfer, loan, and insurance.
