= Kingsoft Office Software =

Chinese software company

Beijing Kingsoft Office Software, Inc.
- Trade name: Kingsoft Office
- Native name: 北京金山办公软件股份有限公司
- Type: Public (subsidiary)
- Traded as: SSE: 688111; CSI A100 component
- Industry: Software
- Founded: 20 December 2011; 14 years ago
- Headquarters: Beijing, China
- Key people: Zou Tao (Chairman); Zhang Qingyuan (CEO)
- Products: WPS Office
- Revenue: ▲CN¥4.56 billion (2023)
- Net income: ▲CN¥1.32 billion (2023)
- Total assets: ▲CN¥13.97 billion (2023)
- Total equity: ▲CN¥10.02 billion (2023)
- Number of employees: 4,558 (2023)
- Parent: Kingsoft
- Website: www.wps.cn

Beijing Kingsoft Office Software, Inc. (Chinese: 金山办公; pinyin: Jīnshān Bàngōng) is a publicly listed Chinese software company. Its most notable product is the office suite, WPS Office.

It is a subsidiary of Kingsoft.

== Background ==
In 1988, Kingsoft was founded and in the same year launched the first edition of the Kingsoft Office suite (renamed to WPS Office in 2014).

In 2011, Lei Jun returned to Kingsoft where he became its chairman while also chairing Xiaomi. The strategy of Kingsoft changed to focus more on mobile devices and Kingsoft started yielding more power to its subsidiaries and joint ventures.

In December 2011, the Kingsoft Office unit was spun-off as a separate unit named Kingsoft Office Software. This was considered the turning point for Kingsoft Office which until this point had struggled competing with Microsoft Office in China. Kingsoft Office was able to enter android devices four years earlier than Microsoft Office which allowed it to win over more users including those in overseas markets.

On 18 November 2019, Kingsoft Office Software held its initial public offering becoming a listed company on the Shanghai Stock Exchange STAR Market.

On 5 January 2021, outgoing U.S. president Donald Trump signed an executive order to ban WPS Office operating in the United States saying its data collection capabilities posed a threat to U.S. national security. Kingsoft Office Software stated it wouldn't have a substantial short-term impact on its business. A few days later, U.S. president Joe Biden revoked the order but said the White House remained concerned about the risks posed by the product and would continue to evaluate them.

On 25 June 2022, an aspiring Chinese writer claimed that she was locked out of her documents on WPS office with a warning stating the document might contain forbidden content and access was suspended. The story went viral on Weibo with users outraged about WPS office monitoring users' personal documents. In response, Kingsoft Office Software stated it had restricted third-party access to an online document that violated China's cyberspace rules. It also stated it was required by the Cyberspace Administration of China to examine and approve documents connected online, and does so using encryption that protects users' privacy. Eventually the writer regained access to the document three days later and Kingsoft Office Software sent an employee to apologize to her saying the content-scanning machine had made a mistake.

In July 2023, Kingsoft Office Software launched its artificial intelligence tool for WPS Office, WPS AI.

== See also ==
- Kingsoft
- WPS Office
- Microsoft Office
