= Quick Look =

MacOS file preview feature introduced by Apple in 2007

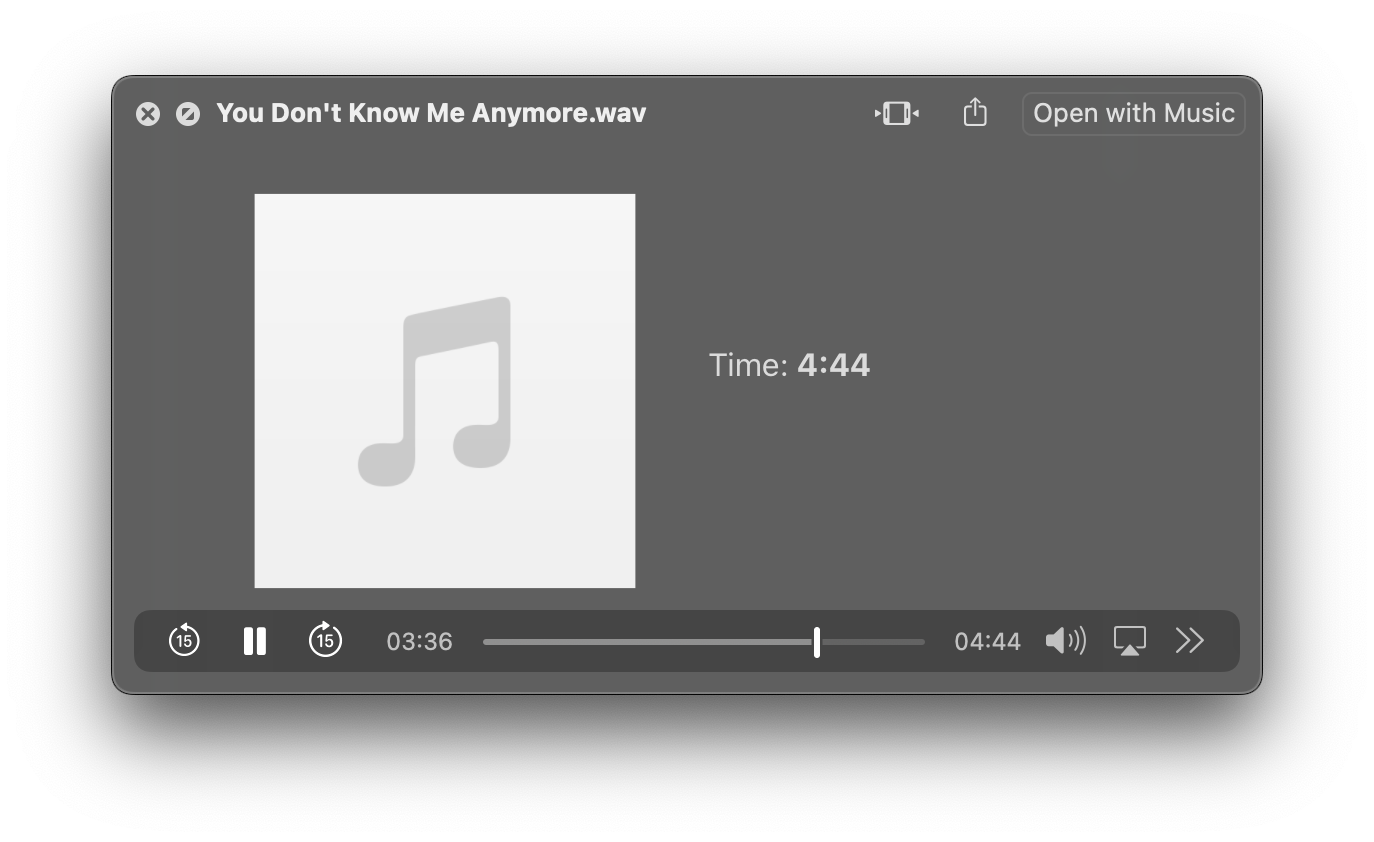
- Quick Look running on macOS Sonoma
- Developer: Apple Inc.
- Release: October 26, 2007 (Mac OS X 10.5 Leopard)
- Operating system: macOS
- License: Proprietary
- Website: Quick Look

Quick Look is a quick preview feature developed by Apple Inc. which was introduced in its operating system Mac OS X 10.5 Leopard. The feature was announced at the Worldwide Developers Conference on June 11, 2007.

While macOS's Finder has always had smaller previews in Get Info windows or column view, Quick Look allows users to look at the contents of a file at full or near-full size in the Finder, depending on the size of the document relative to the screen resolution. It can preview files such as PDFs, HTML, QuickTime readable media, plain text and RTF text documents, iWork (Keynote, Pages, and Numbers) documents, ODF documents, Microsoft Office (Word, Excel, and PowerPoint) files (including OOXML), and RAW camera images.

Quick Look can also be opened in full screen and launched from the command line. Additionally, multi-page documents like PowerPoint slide shows can be navigated using the slide previews at the side of the preview window.

Quick Look technology is implemented throughout the Apple suite of software starting with Mac OS X 10.5, including iChat Theater, Time Machine, and Finder's Cover Flow.

Quick Look APIs are available to developers via the Quick Look framework on iOS and as part of the Quartz framework on the Mac.

== Supported file types by default ==
Since its debut, Quick Look has included a number of generators for common file types.

Format	Version introduced	Notes
AAC	10.5	Cover art in icon view and can play back audio in full preview.
Adobe Photoshop	10.5	
AIFF	10.5	
Apple Icon Image format	10.5	
AVI	10.5	
BMP	10.5	
COLLADA's DAE	10.6	
Cinema 4D's .c4d		Displays the 2D Preview Image embedded in the file.
GIF	10.5	Did not animate animated GIFS without additional plugins until OS X 10.7.
HTML	10.5	Does not load remote resources or execute scripts.
iChat transcripts	10.5	
JPEG	10.5	
JPEG 2000	10.5	
Microsoft Excel	10.5	
Microsoft PowerPoint	10.5	
Microsoft Word	10.5	
MIDI	10.5	MIDI files support has been dropped in OS X 10.8.
MP3	10.5	Cover art in icon view and can play back audio in full preview.
MPEG4	10.5	
MPO		
PDF	10.5	
PictureClipping	10.6	
PICT	10.5	
PNG	10.5	
QuickTime movies	10.5	Additional stream formats require the appropriate QuickTime extension to be installed.
RTF	10.5	
SVG	10.6	
TEXT	10.5	
TextClipping	10.6	
TIFF	10.5	
WAV	10.5	

== Plug-ins ==
Plug-ins can be added to Quick Look to allow previewing the content of other file formats. Plug-ins can also be used to add additional functionality to Quick Look such as syntax highlighting for source code files.

To add a plug-in to Quick Look it needs to be placed in the folder /Library/QuickLook/. To activate that plug-in, either the computer needs to be restarted or Quick Look needs to be reset with the command

qlmanage -r

== Usage ==
There are multiple ways to invoke Quick Look.

Keyboard shortcuts:

- ⌘ Cmd-Y
- space
- ⌥ Opt-space (open in full screen)
- ⌥ Opt hold to zoom an image to actual size (Quick Look must already be open)

Command line:

qlmanage -p file

Menu:

- File — Quick Look file name;
- Context menu (right-click or Control-mouse click), then Quick Look file name.

== Caching and Forensics ==
Quick Look can be exploited when conducting a forensic examination of a computer's contents. A thumbnail cache is created for each user in a random subfolder of /var/folders called com.apple.QuickLook.thumbnailcache. The cache contains two files;

- index.sqlite which is a SQLite database containing two tables - files and thumbnails.

files contains the name, path, file-identifier, and volume-identifier of each file in the database.

thumbnails contains metadata about each thumbnail, including the file linked-to in the files table and the offset of its data contained in thumbnails.data.

- thumbnails.data contains the raw bitmaps of the cached thumbnails.

Quick Look thumbnails are stored for documents on internal disks and also for documents located on removable disks, including those that have been encrypted and can pose a significant security hole. A document may well have a number of thumbnails, each having different dimensions that can range from very large to very small.

The cache can be reset by invoking the qlmanage -r cache command via a Terminal window.

== See also ==
- GNOME sushi
- Office Open XML software
- OpenDocument software
- Windows thumbnail cache
