= JX Online 3 =

2016 massively multiplayer online role-playing video game

- Developer: Kingsoft
- Publisher: Seasun Games
- Platform: Microsoft Windows
- Release: WW: 2016
- Genre: Massively multiplayer online role-playing game
- Modes: Single-player, multiplayer

JX Online 3 (剑侠情缘经典版) is a massively multiplayer online role-playing game (MMORPG) having 3.3 million daily active users in East Asia in April 2020. It is developed by Kingsoft and operated by its subsidiary Seasun Games.

It combines world-building with martial arts.

JX3 HD Remake is one of China's biggest games.

JX3 is the first Vulkan game to support ray tracing and it is one of the first 11 games to support Nvidia's RTX Ray Tracing.

In 2024, "JX Online 3: Boundless" already launched, supporting use on mobile phones, tablets, laptops, and desktop computers. It features cross-platform compatibility and is also linked with existing accounts from the flagship version.
