= GNOME sushi =

File previewer software

sushi
- sushi 0.4 previewing a PNG image in Nautilus on Fedora 17 Beta.
- Developer: The GNOME Project
- Stable release: 50.0 / 26 April 2026; 4 months ago
- Platform: GNOME
- Website: gitlab.gnome.org/GNOME
- Repository: gitlab.gnome.org/GNOME/sushi.git

sushi is a file previewer for the GNOME desktop environment. It is available as a standalone package that integrates with GNOME Files (formerly named Nautilus).

== History and functionality ==
Sushi was first introduced in GNOME Shell 3.2. Its sole purpose is to preview files in Nautilus, which can be invoked by hitting the spacebar while selecting a file. Sushi's abilities extend from the GStreamer framework, enabling the playback of all content which GStreamer supports, by default and through plugins. In addition to media formats, sushi supports previewing of most plain-text documents, including scripts (with syntax highlighting), as well as HTML documents, PDF files, and SVG files.

== See also ==
- gThumb – image viewer and image organizer software with editing capabilities
- Quick Look
- List of GNOME applications
