= PlanMaker =

Spreadsheet program

SoftMaker PlanMaker
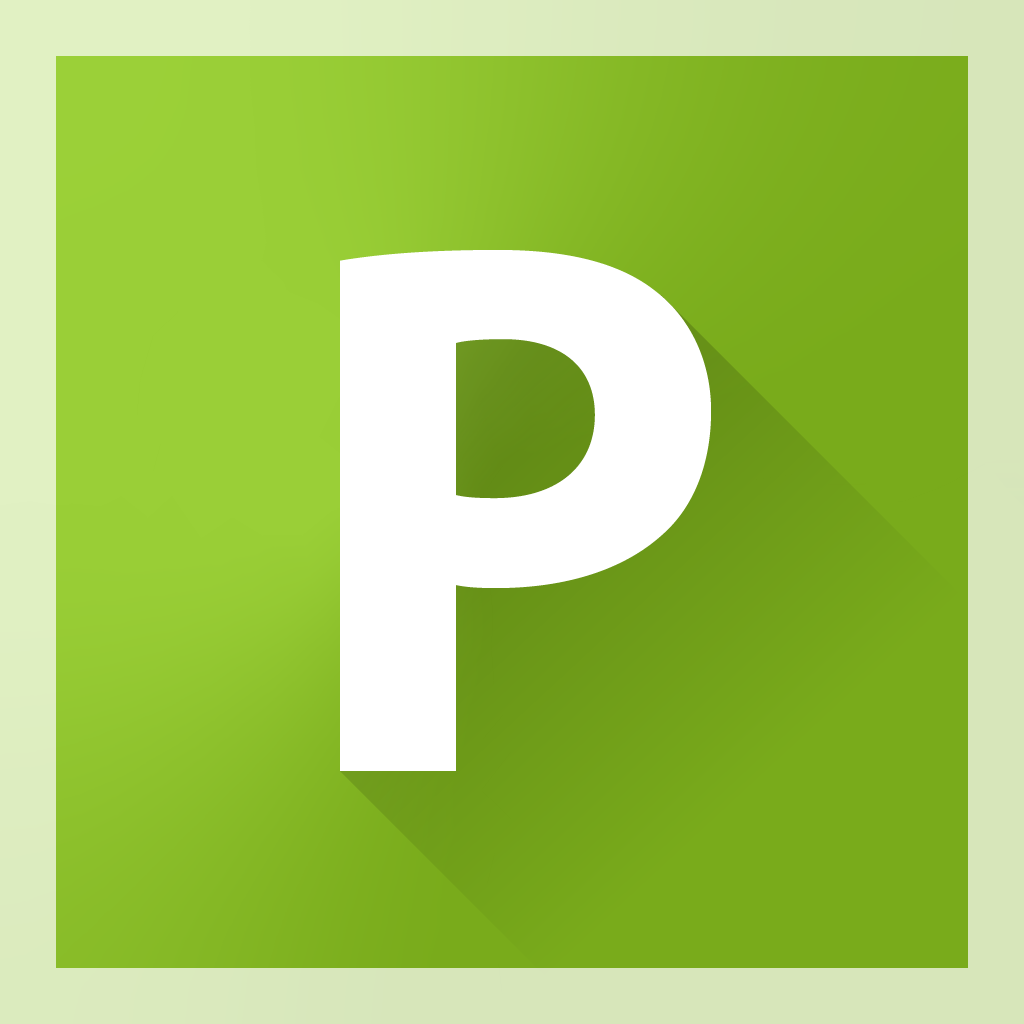
- Original author: SoftMaker
- Initial release: 2007
- Stable release: 2024 / September 7, 2023; 2 years ago
- Operating system: Microsoft Windows, Linux, MacOS, Android, iOS
- Type: presentation program
- License: Proprietary (commercial or freeware/registerware)

PlanMaker is a spreadsheet program that is part of the SoftMaker Office suite. It is available on Microsoft Windows, MacOS, Linux and Android and iOS.

PlanMaker is largely similar to Microsoft Excel in function and workflow and uses the same file format .xlsx. The syntax of the formulas is identical, pivot tables are possible. Furthermore it can import SQLite databases.

Macros and VBA scripts contained in .xlsm cannot be executed, but are retained when saving. BasicMaker provides a VBA-like scripting language under Windows for SoftMaker Office.
