= EasyOffice =

Office suite for Microsoft Windows

EasyOffice was an office suite for Microsoft Windows developed by E-Press corporation that came in two versions:

- EasyOffice Freeware, free for non-commercial personal use. It was featured in Maximum PC magazine as the second best alternative for Microsoft Office in 2004.
- EasyOffice Premium, consists of EasyOffice Freeware plus a PDF Filter and EasyAntiVirus, an antivirus program

EasyOffice was replaced with another suite, also now defunct, simply called ONE (also released in a scaled down form as ONE SE). The company's former website (www.e-press.com) is now a parked domain.

== Included applications ==
- EasyWord with PDF Filter (DOC, RTF, HTML, and PDF files)
- EasyMail integrated with CRM, EasySchedule, EasyCRM, high-speed Anti-Spam
- EasySpreadsheet (XLS files); EasyPresentation (PowerPoint-like presentations)
- EasyDictionary (full-reference dictionary)
- EasyBookKeeper (accounting)
- EasyPad (Notepad replacement)
- Easy Contact Manager (hot lists, mass e-mails, form letters)
- EasySpeaker (reads docs and e-mails out loud)
- EasyZip (full-fledged zipping/unzipping program)
- EasyHelper
- EasyImage
- EasyDatabase
- EasyCalculator
- EasyCalendar
- EasyBackup

== See also ==
- List of office suites
- Comparison of office suites
