= CloudWalk Technology =

Chinese software company

CloudWalk Technology Co Ltd
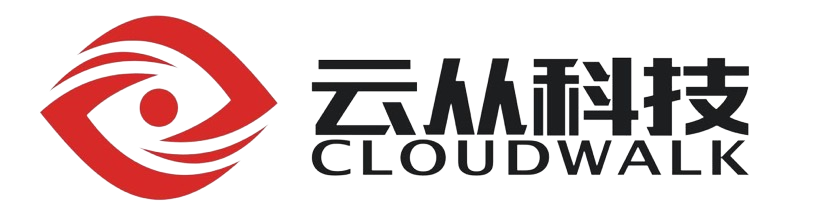
- Native name: 云从科技集团股份有限公司
- Type: Public
- Traded as: SSE: 688327
- Industry: Facial recognition
- Founded: 27 March 2015; 11 years ago
- Founder: Zhou Xi
- Headquarters: Guangzhou, Guangdong, China
- Website: www.cloudwalk.cn

CloudWalk Technology Co. Ltd. is a Chinese developer of facial recognition software.

The company has been sanctioned by the United States government for allegedly participating in major human rights abuses against Uyghurs.

== History ==
CloudWalk was founded by Zhou Xi, a graduate of the University of Science and Technology of China with an academic background in artificial intelligence and pattern recognition. CloudWalk was founded in April 2015, following Zhou's departure from the Chinese Academy of Sciences.

CloudWalk's initial funding came from the Guangzhou municipal government in 2017. The same year, CloudWalk raised $379 million in Series B funding from investors including Shunwei Capital, Oriza Holdings, and Puhua Capital. In 2018, CloudWalk signed an agreement with the government of Zimbabwe to create a national facial-recognition database and monitoring system.

Cloudwalk recorded an aggregate net loss of US$398 million from 2018 to 2020. Other than the company's financial state, the company also dealt with regulations relating to personal data, preventing it from publicly listing its shares. In 2021, its initial public offering (IPO) application was accepted by the Shanghai Stock Exchange. In May 2022, the company floated some of its shares publicly on the Shanghai Stock Exchange. However, the initial public offering price was lower than what was originally anticipated which was slashed by 29 percent from the pre-IPO valuation.

In May 2023, CloudWalk released their large language model, Comfort, for beta testing.

=== Role in mass surveillance of the Uyghurs ===
On May 22, 2020, the United States Department of Commerce added CloudWalk Technology to its Entity List for its role in aiding the Chinese government in the mass surveillance of the Uyghur population. CloudWalk Technology partnered with the University of Illinois at Urbana–Champaign to develop the surveillance technology. According to U.S. officials, CloudWalk Technology was "complicit in human rights violations and abuses committed in China's campaign of repression, mass arbitrary detention, forced labor and high-technology surveillance against Uighurs, ethnic Kazakhs, and other members of Muslim minority groups in the Xinjiang Uighur Autonomous Region (XUAR)". In December 2021, the United States Department of the Treasury prohibited all U.S. investment in Cloudwalk Technology, accusing the company of complicity in aiding the Uyghur genocide.

In October 2022, the United States Department of Defense added CloudWalk to a list of "Chinese military companies" operating in the U.S.

== Customers ==
CloudWalk is the primary supplier of facial recognition technology to the Bank of China and Haitong Securities.

In 2018, CloudWalk signed a deal to provide the government of Zimbabwe with a mass facial recognition system, which will monitor all major transportation hubs, as well as create a national facial ID database.
