= Palm Foleo =

Shelved subnotebook computer by Palm Inc.

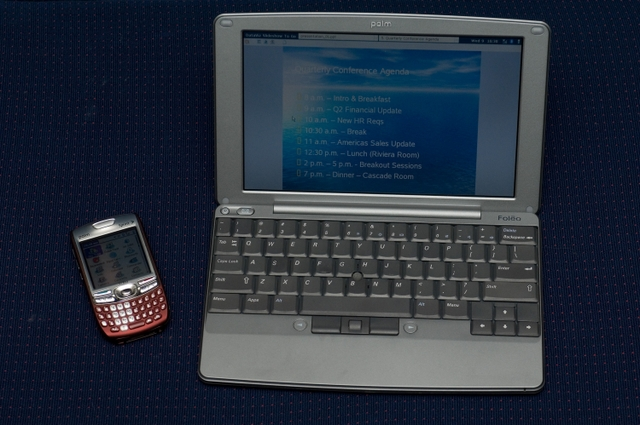
- Palm Foleo (right), sitting next to a Palm Treo 755p (left)
- Manufacturer: Palm, Inc.
- Type: Subnotebook or "Mobile Companion"
- Media: CompactFlash, SD card
- Operating system: Linux
- CPU: Intel PXA27x 416MHz
- Memory: 256MB Flash (126 MB available), 128MB RAM
- Display: 10.2" 1024x600 LCD; Supports 1024x768 (XGA) external display output
- Camera: None
- Connectivity: Wi-Fi (802.11b), Bluetooth 1.2, USB, VGA display output (via included dongle)
- Power: Unknown, but reportedly 5 hour battery life
- Dimensions: 268 × 169 × 24 mm (10.55 × 6.65 × 0.94 in)
- Weight: 1.133 kg (2.4 lbs)

The Palm Foleo (stylised as Folēo) was a planned subnotebook computer that was announced by mobile device manufacturer Palm Inc. on May 30, 2007, and canceled three months later. It was meant to serve as a companion for smartphones including Palm's own Treo line. The device ran on the Linux operating system and featured 256 MB of flash memory and an immediate boot-up feature.

The Foleo featured wireless access via Bluetooth and Wi-Fi. Integrated software included an e-mail client which was to be capable of syncing with the Treo E-Mail client, the Opera web browser and the Documents To Go office suite. The client did not send and retrieve mail over the Wi-Fi connection, instead transmitting via synchronization with the companion smartphone.

The device was slated to launch in the U.S. in the third quarter of 2007 for a price expected by Palm to be $499 after an introductory $100 rebate. Palm canceled Foleo development on September 4, 2007, with Palm CEO Ed Colligan announcing that the company would return its focus to its core product of smartphones and handheld computers. Soon after the device was canceled, a branch of subnotebooks called netbooks, similar to the Foleo in size and functionality, reached the market. Had it been released, the Foleo would have been the founding device in the category. At the time, Palm was performing poorly in face of heavy competition in the smartphone market. The company's sales did not recover, and it was purchased by information technology giant Hewlett-Packard in April 2010.

== Software ==
The Foleo was initially reported to run a modified Linux kernel. The kernel was reported as being version 2.6.14-rmk1-pxa1-intc2 ("rmk1" indicates this is the ARM architectural version, "pxa1" indicates it is of the PXA family of Intel/Marvell Technology Group XScale processors, "intc2" is possibly an IRQ handler). On August 7, 2007, Palm announced that it had chosen Wind River Systems to help it customize the standard Linux kernel to make it more suitable for this device.

The device used a custom-built widget framework called HxUI, which is based on the LiTE toolbox over the DirectFB graphics subsystem. HxUI uses XML to describe its interfaces. Bundled Applications included the Opera web browser (Supports Flash and Ajax, but not Flash video), an E-mail application, a PDF viewer, and DocumentsToGo to handle Microsoft Word, Excel, and PowerPoint documents.

A number of companies had announced plans to release applications for this product. For example, LogMeIn planned to provide remote PC access capabilities to the Foleo, Avenuu planned to provide remote file access, Bluefire planned to provide VPN software. On July 26, 2007, Normsoft was the first company to announce an MP3 player for Foleo. Some executives at Palm had suggested that the fan-less CPU would probably not be able to play back video, while others had disagreed. Other companies had announced plans for games, a photo editor, and blogging tools.

== Criticism ==
Initial reaction to the Foleo in the trade press was mixed, with reviewers such as Tim Bajarin, Gizmodo, and Slashgear giving the device positive reviews, while other analysts noted that subnotebooks had never found a large market. Leslie Fiering, a vice president of research group Gartner stated that Palm has "created a device that's not quite pocketable, but it's not quite full function, either". Users on forums and news sites have mocked the name (with a few calling it the Palm Fooleo), and criticized the apparent lack of ability to run Palm OS applications, the lack of multimedia features and the price. TechRadar said "If you've got a mobile that can handle email, why on earth would you want the Foleo?"

Gartner analyst Todd Kort called the Foleo "the most disappointing product I've seen in several years". He added: "To think that anyone would carry something with a 10-inch display at 2.5 pounds as an adjunct to a phone just doesn't make any sense to me." (The Sydney Morning Herald, May 31, 2007).

Palm continued to tout the device as an alternative to carrying a standard laptop when traveling, as it was cheaper, smaller, lighter, and sturdier, with a longer battery life and the ability to access the internet through a smartphone when not in range of a Wi-Fi network. Despite its lack of computational power for such tasks as video playback or 3D games, a few reviewers were very positive about this possibility.
