= Kingsoft =

Chinese software company

Kingsoft Corporation

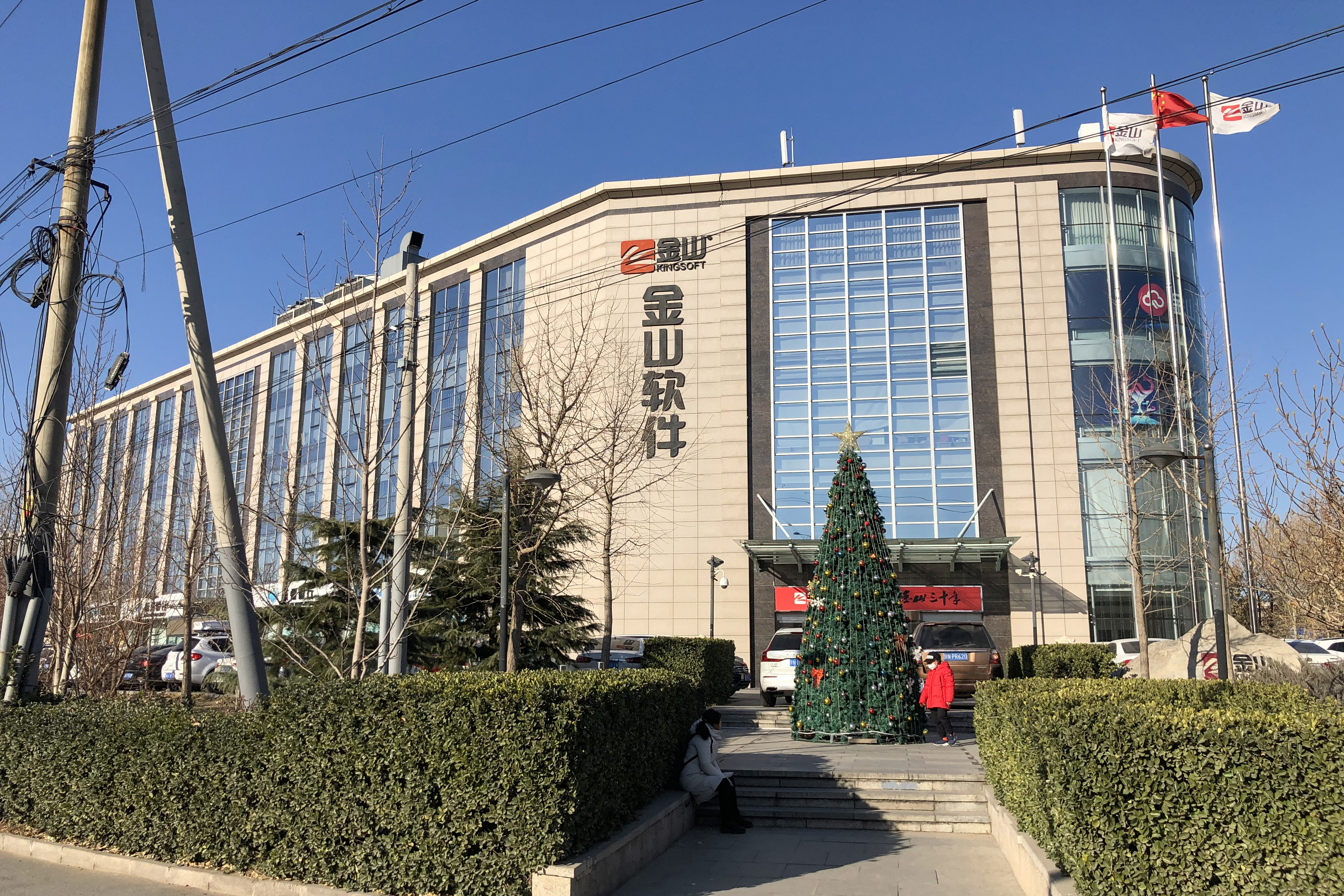
- Headquarters
- Native name: 金山软件
- Romanized name: Jīnshān Ruǎnjiàn
- Type: Public
- Traded as: SEHK: 3888
- ISIN: KYG5264Y1089
- Industry: Software industry
- Founded: 1988; 38 years ago
- Founder: Qiu Bojun
- Headquarters: Beijing, China
- Number of locations: 6 offices (2018)
- Key people: Lei Jun (chairman); Zou Tao (CEO); Ng Yuk Keung (CFO)
- Number of employees: ~7,000 (2018)
- Subsidiaries: Seasun; Cheetah Mobile; Kingsoft Cloud; Kingsoft Office Software
- Website: kingsoft.com

Kingsoft Corporation (Chinese: 金山软件; pinyin: Jīnshān Ruǎnjiàn) is a Chinese software company based in Beijing. Kingsoft operates four subsidiaries: Seasun for video game development, Cheetah Mobile for mobile internet apps, Kingsoft Cloud for cloud storage platforms, and Kingsoft Office Software for office software, including WPS Office. It also produced security software known as Kingsoft Security. The most popular game developed by Kingsoft is JX Online 3, launched in 2009.

Kingsoft owns data centers in mainland China, Hong Kong, Russia, Southeast Asia, and North America. The company is listed on the Hong Kong Stock Exchange.

== History ==
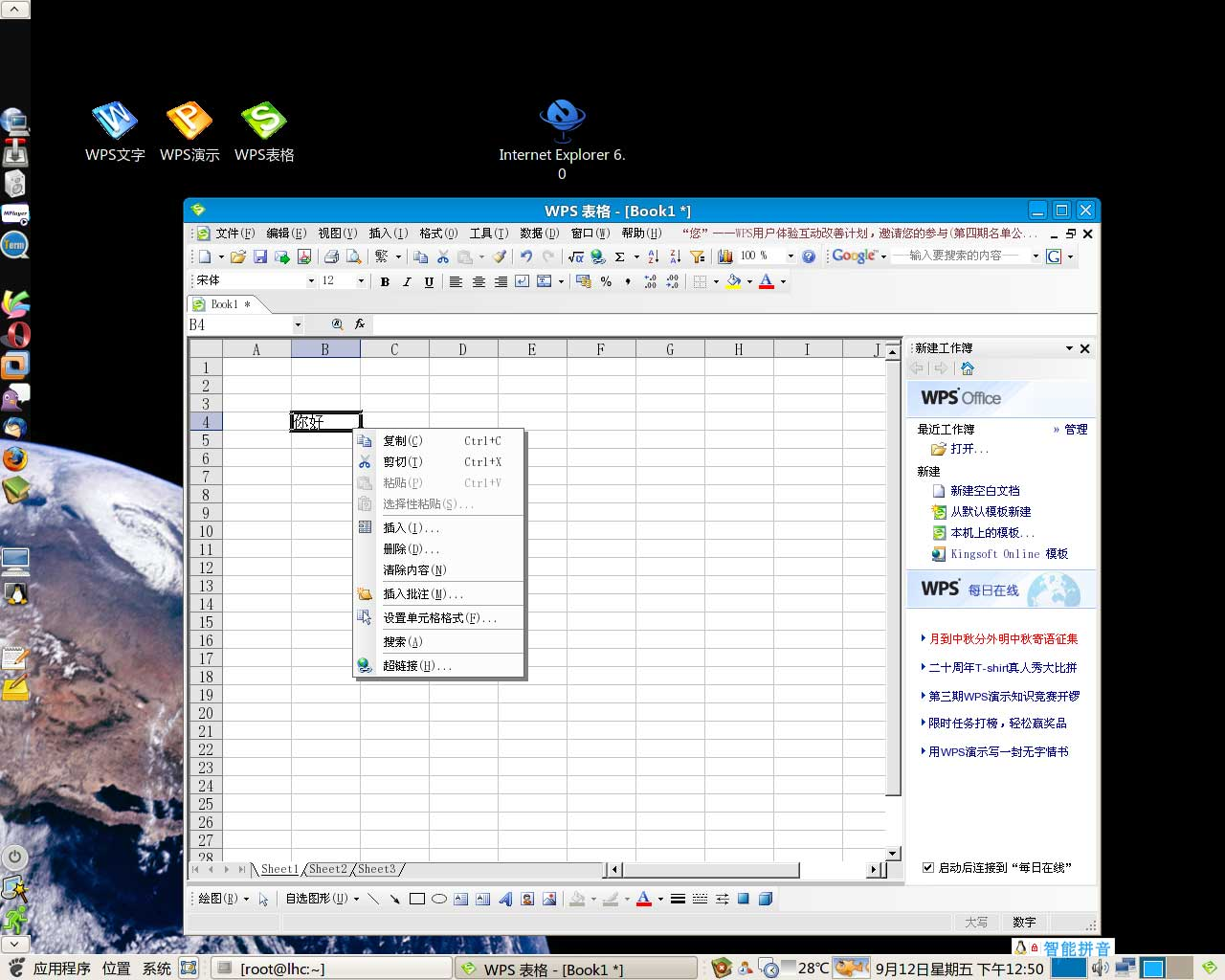
Screenshot of the company's software

The company was founded in 1988 by Qiu Bojun. In 2011, Bojun sold his 15.68% stake in Kingsoft to Tencent.
