= MacLinkPlus =

Discontinued file format translation tool for classic Mac OS

- File conversion window for MacLinkPlus Deluxe
- Developer: DataViz
- Final release: 16.0010 / May 1, 2007; 19 years ago
- Operating system: Mac OS X
- Type: File conversion
- License: Proprietary

MacLinkPlus was a file format translation tool for classic Mac OS and PowerPC-era Mac OS X made by DataViz. It could convert and open files created for another operating system, or by programs that may not be available on the user's computer. Thus, it could open a Word or Excel file even if Microsoft Office was not installed. MacLinkPlus supported, among others, word processing files, spreadsheet files, database programs and graphic formats.

Once installed, the application displayed an icon on the desktop onto which users could drag and drop their documents to have them converted.

MacLinkPlus was bundled by Apple with new Macintosh purchases from 1994–1997. It worked in conjunction with Macintosh Easy Open in order to ease the transition of customers' documents from PCs or older Macs. DataViz also sold MacLinkPlus separately at retail, for users who did not have bundled copies.

Following the unbundling by Apple, DataViz added the "Deluxe" moniker to the MacLinkPlus Deluxe 10 release in 1998, in order to distinguish it from previously bundled versions. MacLinkPlus Deluxe 13 added native Mac OS X compatibility in 2001. They continued with near annual releases until version 15 in 2004. A final version, MacLinkPlus Deluxe 16, was released in 2007. Because of the age of its code base, MacLinkPlus was never updated to include Intel compatibility, and as such, Mac OS X Snow Leopard is the last operating system version on which it will run. It was quietly discontinued and is no longer sold by DataViz.
