= SoftMaker Presentations =

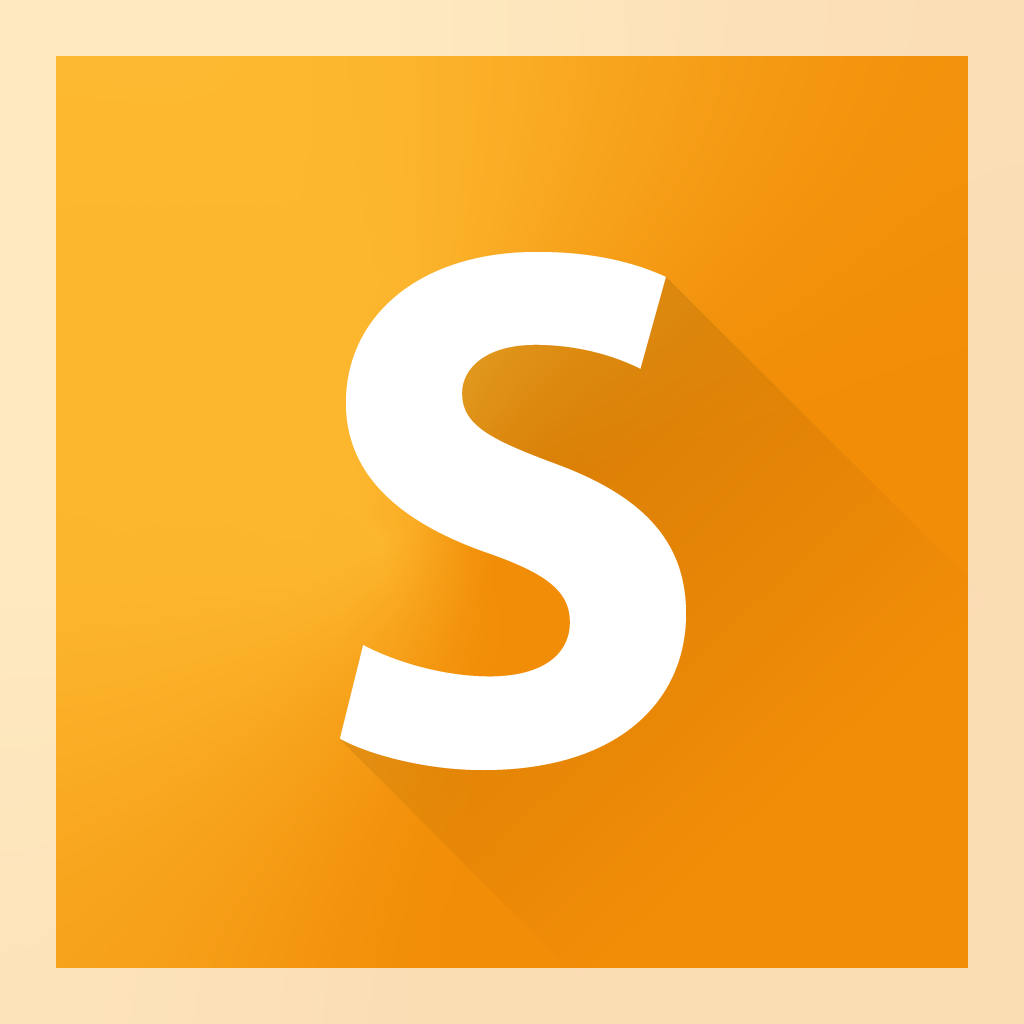
- Original author: SoftMaker
- Release: 2007
- Stable release: 2024
- Operating system: Microsoft Windows, Linux, macOS, Android, iOS
- Type: Presentation program
- License: Proprietary (commercial or freeware/registerware)
- Website: www.softmaker.com/en/softmaker-office-presentations

SoftMaker Presentations is a presentation program compatible with Microsoft PowerPoint and its .pptx, .ppt, and .pps files. It is sold as part of SoftMaker Office but also released as registerware. The application is available for Windows, macOS, Linux as well as Android and iOS.

SoftMaker Presentations offers a choice between a Ribbon-styled user interface or traditional menus and toolbars.

== History ==
The first version of SoftMaker Presentations was released in November 2007 as part of the commercial SoftMaker Office 2008 productivity suite. In May 2011, this version was released as freeware.

The second release was SoftMaker Presentations 2010, released in November 2009 as part of SoftMaker Office 2010. This release added a sidebar similar to the one in Microsoft PowerPoint, video export, DirectX-accelerated animations and transitions, support for picture collections, and improved PDF export.

SoftMaker Office added support for iOS in 2022.

== Features ==
The subscription-version of SoftMaker 2024 includes a connection to ChatGPT, to summarize texts, make improvements or generate text. It translates documents with DeepL Translator and preserves the text formatting.

== See also ==
- Corel Presentations
