= Simdesk =

- Founded: 1999
- Founder: Ray C. Davis
- Defunct: May 1, 2008
- Fate: Ceased operations
- Headquarters: Houston, Texas
- Website: www.simdesk.com

Simdesk, fully known as Simdesk Technologies, Inc., formerly Internet Access Technologies, was a Houston-based software as a service provider of on demand messaging and collaboration tools for business. It was founded by Ray C. Davis in 1999. Early in the company's history, it was sold to municipal authorities. The company began to commercially offer Simdesk direct to small businesses in March 2006. There were several Simdesk resellers, including KDDI in Japan.

== Discontinuation ==
On May 1, 2008, Simdesk ceased operations, terminating retail hosted services for SMB and individual customers in the United States and Latin America. It was announced that externally hosted services based on Simdesk's platform license would remain in place. (As of 2009, the URLs have gone dark.) Its future direction has not been announced.
