= IBM Works =

- Developer: IBM
- Operating system: OS/2
- Type: Office suite

IBM Works is an office suite for the IBM OS/2 operating system. It includes word processing, spreadsheet, database and PIM applications.

Originally developed as Legato by IBM UK, it was later taken over by Footprint in Canada, also known as Footprint Works.

IBM Works is included in the BonusPak with OS/2 Warp Version 3 (1994). The last version was shipped with OS/2 Warp Version 4 (1996). IBM Works is not included in any of the later distributions of OS/2 such as ArcaOS, but is still possible to install it.

== See also ==
- Comparison of office suites
