= TextClipping =

Text file created in Mac OS X

textClipping is an extension used by Macintosh computers for strings of text since Mac OS 9. When a string of text is selected and dragged to the desktop or anywhere on a Macintosh computer, the computer automatically converts it into a .textClipping file. The file formed can conveniently be dragged to any text box to replicate the exact text, including its formatting.

If the selected text is interpreted as a URL or an email address then a .webloc or a .mailloc file will be created, respectively, instead of a .textClipping file. The file type for a .textClipping file is: clpt. The file type for a .webloc is: ilht, and for a .mailloc is: ilma. For Mac OS 12.7.6, Monterey, the text clipping contains rich text code in the data fork, surrounded by additional code, the resource fork contains additional formats.

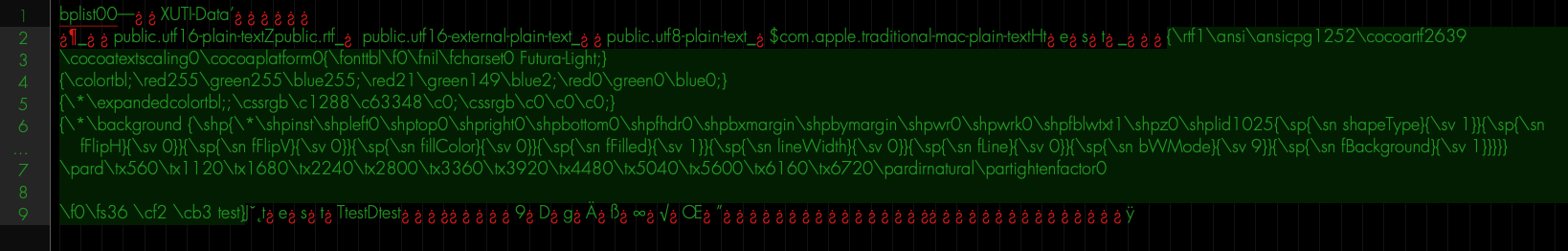
File:Test.textClipping-Details.pngText clipping data fork contents.

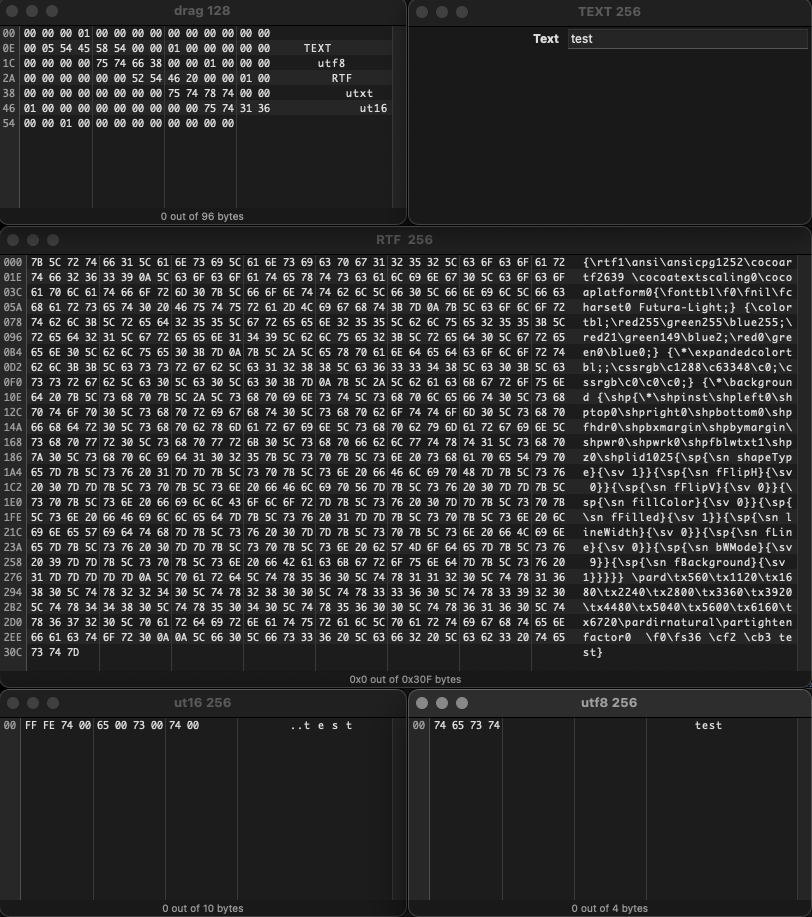
File:Test.textClipping-ResourceFork.pngText clipping resource fork contents.

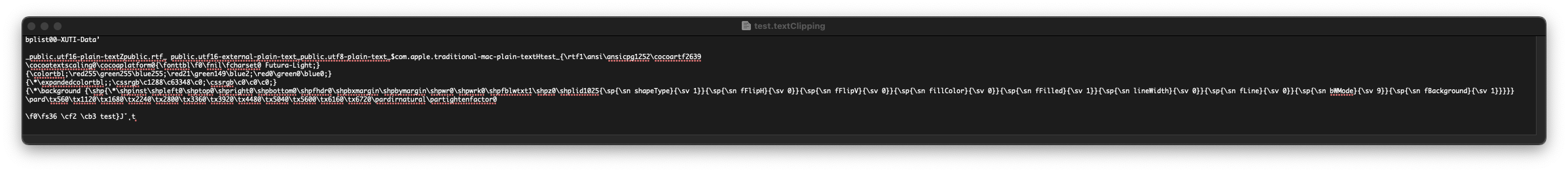
File:Test.textClipping-inTextEdit.pngText clipping opened in TextEdit.

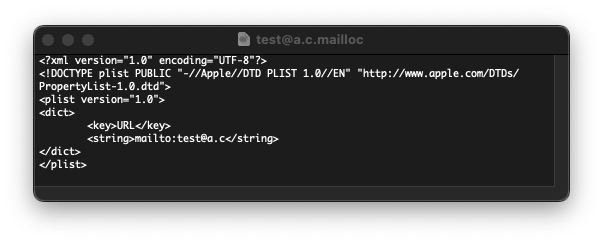
File:Test@a.c.mailloc-inTextedit.png.mailloc file created instead of a text clipping because it was interpreted as an email address.

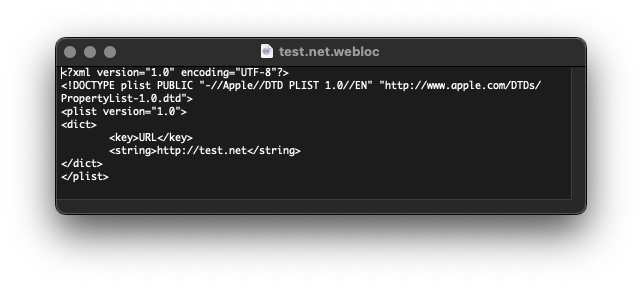
File:Test.net.webloc.png.webloc file created instead of a text clipping because it was interpreted as an website address.

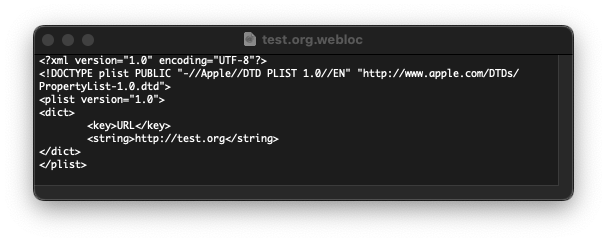
File:Test.org.webloc.png.webloc file created instead of a text clipping because it was interpreted as an website address.

Because of its legacy origins, the contents of textClipping files are not stored inside the actual data "fork" of the file, and the files cannot easily be shared between Macs or sent to other machines like an attachment. Opening the textClipping file in most applications will show a 0 byte empty data file. When macOS views or performs an action on a textClipping file, it performs a lookup of the file's resource fork where the contents are actually stored.

Unlike most file extensions, .textClipping separates the words in its name using capitalization (called Camel case), a practice commonly used in many programming languages.
