= Shunwei Capital =

China-based venture capital firm

- Native name: 顺为资本
- Type: Private
- Industry: Venture Capital
- Founded: 2011
- Founders: Lei Jun; Tuck Lye Koh
- Headquarters: Beijing, China
- Products: Investments
- AUM: US$3 billion (2023)
- Website: www.shunwei.com

Shunwei Capital (Chinese: 顺为资本; pinyin: Shùnwèi zīběn) is a Beijing-based venture capital firm founded in 2011. It was founded by Lei Jun (the founder and CEO of Xiaomi) and Tuck Lye Koh. The firm focuses on investing in the technology sector in China as well as other countries such as India and Indonesia.According to the South China Morning Post, from January 2019 to May 2020, it was the ninth most active venture capital firm in China.

== Background ==
Shunwei Capital was founded in 2011 by Lei Jun and Tuck Lye Koh. Lei was previously the CEO of Kingsoft until 2007, as well as founder of Xiaomi in 2010. Meanwhile, Koh was a Singaporean who worked in China for GIC and C.V. Starr Investment Advisors focusing on technology investments. From August 2006 to May 2008, Tuck Lye Koh served as a director of Kingsoft and Vice President of GIC Special Investments (Beijing) Company Ltd., responsible for private investments in Greater China.

The firm provides growth capital to internet and technology companies mainly in China but also in other countries such as India and Indonesia. Investments have been made by the firm in telecommunications, digital media, video games, Rural Internet, and financial technology sectors. Its notable investments include ByteDance, Kuaishou, Shein, Nio, IQIYI, Xpeng Motors, Kanzhun Limited, Webull and CloudWalk Technology. Non-Chinese investments include Koo and Zomato.

Due to tensions between China and India resulting from the 2020–2021 China–India skirmishes, Shunwei divested its positions and withdrew its plans for India.

Investors of the firm include sovereign wealth funds, funds of funds, university endowment funds, and family offices.

Shunwei Capital's name comes from a Chinese idiom (順勢而為) that means "to leverage a trend to achieve greatness".
