= Lei Jun =

Chinese billionaire entrepreneur (born 1969)

- 雷军
- Lei in 2026
- Born: 16 December 1969 (age 56); Xiantao, Hubei, China
- Education: Wuhan University (BS)
- Occupations: Founder, Chairman & CEO of Xiaomi; Chairman of Kingsoft; Chairman of UCWeb Inc. Chairman of YY.com; Chairman of Shunwei Capital; Deputy of the National People's Congress
- Known for: Founder of Xiaomi
- Board member of: Kingsoft
- Spouse: Zhang Tong (张彤)
- Children: 2
- Website: Weibo page

Lei Jun
- Simplified Chinese: 雷军
- Traditional Chinese: 雷軍
Transcriptions
Standard Mandarin
- Hanyu Pinyin: Léi Jūn
- IPA: [lěɪ.tɕýn]

Lei Jun (born 16 December 1969) is a Chinese billionaire entrepreneur and computer engineer. He is known for being the founder, chairman, and CEO of the consumer electronics company Xiaomi. He also is the chairman of Kingsoft and Shunwei Capital. Lei has been a deputy to the National People's Congress of the People's Republic of China since 2013.

As of October 2026, Lei's net worth was estimated at US$21.6 billion by Forbes, ranking him 118th worldwide.

== Early life and education ==
Lei was born on 16 December 1969 in the city of Xiantao, Hubei, China. Both of his parents were teachers; his father made $7 a month. As a child, he was interested in electronics and liked disassembling and re-assembling radios, which was encouraged by his father. He made the first electric lamp in his village using two batteries, a bulb, a self-made wooden box, and some wires.

In 1987, he graduated from Hubei Provincial Mianyang High School (湖北省沔阳中学) and started to attend Wuhan University. He graduated from Wuhan University and received a Bachelor of Science degree with a major in Computer Science in 1991.

== Career ==
In 1992, Lei joined Kingsoft as an engineer. He became the CEO of the company in 1998 and led it towards an initial public offering on the Hong Kong Stock Exchange in 2007. On 20 December 2007, he resigned as president and CEO of Kingsoft for "health reasons".

In 2000, Lei founded joyo.com, an online retailing platform, which he sold for US$75 million to Amazon.com in 2004. In 2005, he made a $1 million investment in YY; those shares were worth $129 million when the company became a public company via an initial public offering in 2012. In 2008, he became a chairman of UCWeb.

In 2010, Lei founded Xiaomi with multiple partners, including former Google executive Lin Bin.

In 2011, he co-founded Shunwei Capital (Chinese: 顺为资本), an investment company, via which he invests in companies in the e-commerce, social networking, and mobile industries. Also in 7 July 2011, he rejoined Kingsoft as chairman.

In 2012, Lei Jun was elected as a deputy to the Beijing Municipal People’s Congress. In 2013, he was elected as a delegate to the 12th National People’s Congress representing Guangdong Province.

On 26 December 2013, he founded "Beijing Xiaomi Payment Technology Co., Ltd." with a registered capital of 50 million RMB. Lei Jun was the company’s legal representative and chairman.

On 24 February 2018, he was elected as a deputy to the 13th National People’s Congress.

On 21 June 2018, Lei Jun, along with Xiaomi’s core executives, began the IPO roadshow in Hong Kong. Xiaomi’s stock code was 01810.HK. According to the prospectus, Xiaomi planned to issue 2.18 billion shares with a pricing range between 17 and 22 HKD per share, aiming to raise up to 6.1 billion USD. The authorized share capital had a total nominal value of 675,000 USD, consisting of 70 billion Class A shares and 200 billion Class B shares. Based on this, Xiaomi’s adjusted market value was estimated between 53.9 and 69.7 billion USD.

On the morning of 9 July 2018, at 9:30 AM, Lei Jun rang the gong for Xiaomi’s listing on the Hong Kong Stock Exchange, officially bringing the eight-year-old company to the capital market. Xiaomi became the first company listed under the "weighted voting rights" structure on the exchange, prompting the HKEX to specially commission a new copper gong for the occasion.

In 2019, Xiaomi was named a Fortune Global 500 company, becoming the youngest company on the list at the time.

In March 2021, Lei Jun announced Xiaomi’s entry into the smart electric vehicle industry, with a planned investment of US$10 billion over the following decade.

=== Politics ===
He was elected to serve as a deputy to the Twelfth National People's Congress for the Guangdong congressional district in 2013. He was elected to serve as a deputy to the Thirteenth National People's Congress for the Beijing congressional district in 2018. He was re-elected to serve as a deputy to the Fourteenth National People's Congress for the Beijing congressional district in 2023.

=== Philanthropy ===
By 2017, Lei had donated $1 billion to charity, starting with a ¥140,000 donation in 1997 to his alma mater, Wuhan University. He later made donations to Zhuhai Charity, an organization that funds schools for migrants, the villagers of Yangchun for the renovation of schools and mudbrick houses and construction of cultural buildings, the victims of the 2013 Lushan earthquake, and was a participant in the Ice Bucket Challenge to raise funds for amyotrophic lateral sclerosis. In 2021, he donated over $2.2 billion worth of Xiaomi shares to charity.

In 2023, Lei Jun donated 1.3 billion yuan to Wuhan University, the largest individual donation the university had ever received at the time.

== Personal life ==
Lei and his wife Zhang Tong (张彤) have two children.

== Awards and recognition ==
In 2014, Lei was named Businessman of the Year by Forbes. In 2015, he was named to the Time 100.

In 2019, Lei was recognized as an "Outstanding Builder of Socialism with Chinese Characteristics" (Chinese: 优秀中国特色社会主义事业建设者). The recognition was used by the United States Department of Defense as one of the reasons to add Xiaomi Corporation to a list of companies that support China's military in January 2021. Later, the blacklisting of Xiaomi was blocked by a United States federal court and was removed by the United States Department of Defense after an agreement with Xiaomi was reached.
