= SoftMaker =

German software company

- Company type: GmbH
- Industry: Software
- Founded: 1987; 38 years ago
- Founder: Martin Kotulla
- Headquarters: Nuremberg, Germany
- Area served: Worldwide
- Website: SoftMaker's home page

SoftMaker Software GmbH is a German software company based in Nuremberg that produces office productivity software and digital fonts. SoftMaker was founded in 1987 by Martin Kotulla. Best known in Germany and the EU, SoftMaker is offering its software worldwide.

Students, teachers, schools, and universities can purchase SoftMaker Office for a lower price, part of SoftMaker's academic sales program. Additionally, a free version named FreeOffice is available to all.

== SoftMaker Office ==
SoftMaker Office is SoftMaker's flagship product, an office suite marketed to home, small business and educational users. It consists of the word processor TextMaker (compatible with Microsoft Word), the spreadsheet PlanMaker (compatible with Microsoft Excel) the presentation software application SoftMaker Presentations (compatible with Microsoft PowerPoint) and the scripting language BasicMaker (compatible with Visual Basic for Applications).

SoftMaker Office is currently available for Microsoft Windows, Linux, MacOS and Android. Older versions were available for Windows CE, Handheld PCs, Pocket PCs (Windows Mobile handheld devices) and FreeBSD.

SoftMaker Office supports all popular Microsoft Office file formats. SoftMaker claims to be working on ODF compliant formats, but currently supports OpenDocument only in its word processor and the spreadsheet program.

SoftMaker product	Equivalent Microsoft product	Equivalent Google product	Equivalent Apple product	Platforms	File formats
TextMaker	Word	Docs	Pages	Win32, Win64, macOS, Linux, Android	.docx, .doc, .rtf, .odt, .tmd, .tmdx, .pwd, .txt, .sxw (import only), .pdf (export)
PlanMaker	Excel	Sheets	Numbers	Win32, Win64, macOS, Linux, Android	.xlsx, .xls, .csv, .pmd, .pmdx, .ods (import), .rtf, .dbf, .txt, .slk, .dif, .pdf (export)
Presentations	PowerPoint	Slides	Keynote	Win32, Win64, macOS, Linux, Android	.pptx, .pps, .ppt, .ppsx, .prd, .prdx, .rtf, Export: .png, .jpg, Video and .pdf
BasicMaker	VBA (limited)			Win32, Win64	.bas, .txt

== Competitive strategy ==
The SoftMaker Office sales strategy is based on cross-platform usability along with reasonable pricing and free post-sale customer service. However, since SoftMaker Office is not free like competitors LibreOffice, Apache OpenOffice, or Calligra Suite, its greatest marketing strength is its high degree of Microsoft Office compatibility. As a major sales point, SoftMaker cites its ability to render graphs and charts within PlanMaker which are often indistinguishable from those created within Microsoft's Excel. Significantly, this level of compatibility extends to non-Windows platforms. Even on Windows platforms, SoftMaker Office competes with native Windows office suites based on its Microsoft Office compatibility.

SoftMaker also claims its Office suite is faster, with smaller memory and hard drive footprints than Microsoft Office or OpenOffice.org.

The most significant areas of incompatibility, as with all non-Microsoft office suites, are in documents that use VBA scripts. While BasicMaker is a step forward, it still does not offer seamless VBA compatibility.

== FlexiPDF ==
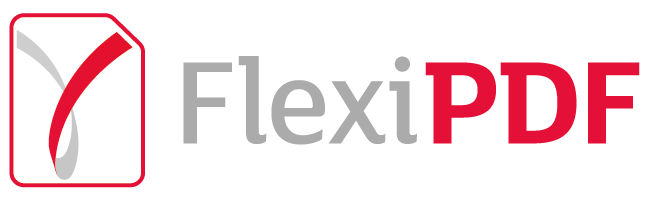
FlexiPDF Logo since 2024

FlexiPDF is a PDF editor allowing the user to modify and add text, images, drawings and form controls. SoftMaker claims that it makes editing PDF files as easy as working with a word processor.

== Digital fonts ==
SoftMaker offers font packages for the home user (MegaFont NOW) and professional user (infiniType).

SoftMaker publishes one font each month free for download from its FreeFont web site.
