= WPS Office =

Office suite software by Kingsoft

- WPS Writer on KDE Neon Linux (2022)
- Developer: Kingsoft
- Release: 1988; 38 years ago
- Stable release: WPS Office for Windows (v.12.2.0.13431) / January 9, 2024; 2 years ago
- Written in: Delphi, C/C++
- Platform: Microsoft Windows, macOS, iOS, Android, Linux, Fire OS, HarmonyOS NEXT
- Available in: Chinese, English, French, German, Indonesian, Italian, Japanese, Malay, Polish, Portuguese, Russian, Spanish, Vietnamese
- Type: Office suite
- License: Proprietary: Personal: Freeware; Business: Commercial
- Website: www.wps.com

WPS Office (an acronym for Writer, Presentation and Spreadsheets, previously known as Kingsoft Office) is an office suite for Microsoft Windows, macOS, Linux, iOS, Android, Fire OS and HarmonyOS developed by the Chinese software company Kingsoft. It comes pre-installed on Amazon Fire tablets, as well as several smartphones and tablets such as Xiaomi devices. WPS Office is made up of WPS Writer, WPS Slides, and WPS Sheets. In 2022, WPS Office had over 494 million monthly active users and over 1.2 billion installations.

The personal basic version is free to use, however a subscription is required to use all features. The WPS Pro and WPS AI versions are available as subscriptions. WPS Office 2016 was released in 2016. As of 2019, the Linux version is developed and supported by a volunteer community rather than Kingsoft itself.

The product has had a long history of development in China under the name "WPS" and "WPS Office". For a time, Kingsoft branded the suite as "KSOffice" for the international market, but later returned to "WPS Office". Since the release of WPS Office 2005, the user interface has been similar to Microsoft Office, and it supports Microsoft document formats, which are now used by default, in addition to its own.

== History ==
=== Origins ===
WPS Office was initially known as Super-WPS文字处理系统 (Super-WPS Word Processing System, then known simply as WPS) in 1988 as a word processor that ran on DOS systems and sold by then-Hong Kong Kingsun COMPUTER CO. LTD.. It was the first Chinese-language word processor designed and developed for the mainland Chinese market. WPS was used from the late 1980s.

=== Early history ===
Faced with competition from Microsoft Office, Kingsoft chief software architect Pak Kwan Kau (求伯君) diverted 4 million Renminbi from his personal account to assist in the development of WPS 97 for Microsoft Windows. In 1997, WPS 97 was released. The next version, WPS 2000, was released two years later. Both products were developed for a 16-bit Windows platform, with the capability of running on 32-bit Windows platforms.

In May 2001, Kingsoft launched a full office suite under the name WPS Office 2001, which contained a word processor together with spreadsheet and presentation applications. With WPS Office 2001, Kingsoft entered the office productivity market in the People's Republic of China.

In 2002, WPS Office 2002 was released, adding an email client to the office suite. WPS Office 2002 aimed to maintain interface compatibility with established office products.

The 2004 incarnation of the office suite, dubbed WPS Office Storm, was released in late 2004. It claimed to offer total backward compatibility with Microsoft Office file formats. Unlike previous versions, WPS Storm was based on OpenOffice.org and was the first WPS Office suite to support operating systems other than Microsoft Windows. Kingsoft collaborated with Intel and IBM to integrate its text-to-text and text-to-speech technology into WPS Office Storm.

In late 2005, WPS Office 2005 was released with a revamped interface and a smaller file size. Besides the Professional edition, a free Simplified Chinese edition was offered for students and home users. A Wine-hosted edition was provided for Linux users of WPS Office Storm.

In 2007, Kingsoft Office 2007 was released. This was the first version that tried to enter international markets, with support for the English and Japanese languages. The native Chinese-language version continued under the name WPS Office.

In 2009, Kingsoft Office 2009 was released. It had increased compatibility with Microsoft Office including support for the newer 2007-version file formats.

In 2011, Kingsoft Office was granted funding from the Chinese government and received further orders from central ministries in China.

Kingsoft Office Suite Free 2012 was released in 2011. Kingsoft Office Professional 2012 and Kingsoft Office Standard 2012 were released for sale in February 2012, in addition to Kingsoft Office for Android. The initial release for Android included standard word processor functions such as creating documents, spreadsheets, and presentations.

On March 28, 2012, Kingsoft announced that WPS for Linux was under development. It is the third WPS Linux product, following WPS Storm and WPS 2005. It was developed from scratch, based on the Qt framework, as compatible as possible with its Windows counterpart.

The free and paid versions of Kingsoft Office 2013 were released on June 4, 2013. They consist of three programs: Writer, Spreadsheets, and Presentation, which are similar to Microsoft Word, Excel, and PowerPoint. WPS Office for Linux Alpha 18 Patch 1 was released on June 11, 2015.

=== 2014–present ===
On June 6, 2014, all Kingsoft Office products were renamed WPS Office.

On December 16, 2014, WPS Office 2014 for Windows, build 9.1.0.4932, was released as a subscription model for a monthly charge of US$3 for some features. The free version provided basic features and supported Microsoft Office .doc, .xls, and .ppt file formats. Premium paid versions provided full compatibility for Microsoft Office files. Officially only the paid 2014 version supported saving files in .docx, .xlsx, and .pptx formats, but, actually, the free version also supported these formats (as had the 2013 free version).

On June 21, 2016, WPS Office 2016 for Windows became generally available as Freemium software, with no subscription needed for basic features.

On May 28, 2017 Kingsoft tweeted that the Linux version was at a halt, but denied this a few days later, removed the tweet, and issued a further alpha version. Kingsoft also tweeted making reference to making WPS Office for Linux open-source towards the end of 2017 to allow the Linux community to step in and continue maintaining it, but later deleted this tweet too. Since at least June 2022, the fully functional Linux freeware version "WPS 2021" could simply be downloaded from the WPS website at no cost to the user.

WPS Office 2019 was released on May 6, 2019. It introduced new integration and personalized features as well as full support for the PDF format.

On July 22, 2021, WPS Office arrived on Huawei's new HarmonyOS platform on smartphones and tablets with Multi-terminal document service capabilities as a native APP format. HarmonyOS version comes with large-screen presentation, small-screen prompts, text highlighting to focus on key information, full-screen video playback without professional settings, small-screen graffiti, large-screen presentation, picture zoom information at a glance, atomic service on-the-go. Also the HarmonyOS version of WPS Office connects the personal version and multi-screen collaboration to improve productivity.

On March 15, 2024, Huawei announced that the WPS Office has completed the HarmonyOS native app core features development for HarmonyOS NEXT system which will launch in fall 2024. It was reported that consumers would soon be able to use a new version of the Office app with smoother and safer services across many devices, and with continuity with smart screen office functionalities.

== Editions ==
WPS Office has versions for multiple operating systems: Windows, macOS, Linux (Fedora, CentOS, OpenSUSE, Ubuntu, Mint, Knoppix), Android, iOS and HarmonyOS. In addition, WPS Office also has a web version.

== File format ==
According to an April 2017 review of WPS Office 2016 Free v10.2.0.5871 for Windows, the program opens and saves all Microsoft Office document formats (doc, docx, xls, xlsx, etc.), HTML, RTF, XML, and PDF.

- Text document formats: wps, wpt, doc, dot, docx, dotx, docm, dotm
- XML document formats: xml, htm, html, mht, mhtm, mhtml
- Spreadsheet document formats: et, ett, xls, xlsx, xlt, xltx, csv, xlsm, xltm, xlsb, ets
- Slideshow document formats: ppt, pot, pps, dps, dpt, pptx, potx, ppsx, pptm, potm, ppsm, dpss

== Exploits ==
Since at least 2018, threat actor 'Blackwood' has used sophisticated methods to operate as an Adversary-in-the-Middle (AitM) to inject malware identified as 'NSPX30' into update mechanisms for WPS Office. Once the malware is installed, it can affect many other programs, such as virus protection software 360 Safeguard, and messaging software such as Skype, Telegram, and Tencent QQ. Activity by this system was first noticed in 2023 by cybersecurity company ESET.

== See also ==
- List of office suites
- Comparison of office suites
- Office Open XML software
- OpenDocument software
- Web desktop
