= SoftMaker Office =

Proprietary office software

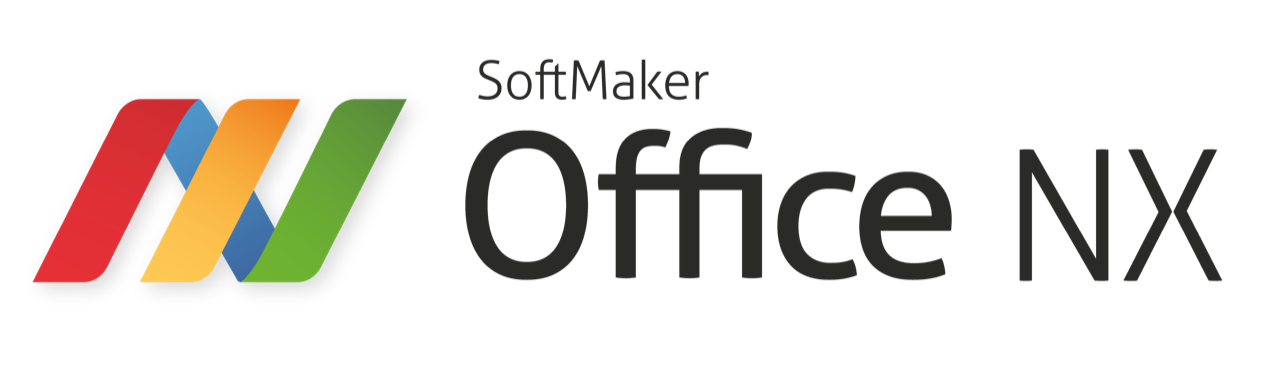
- Original author: SoftMaker
- Release: 1994; 32 years ago
- Stable release: 2024 rev 1224 / 18 March 2025
- Operating system: Windows 7 or later, macOS 10.14 or later, Linux, Android 5.0 or later, iOS 14; Previously: Pocket PCs, Windows CE, Windows Mobile, Qtopia
- License: Proprietary (commercial)
- Website: www.softmaker.com

SoftMaker FreeOffice
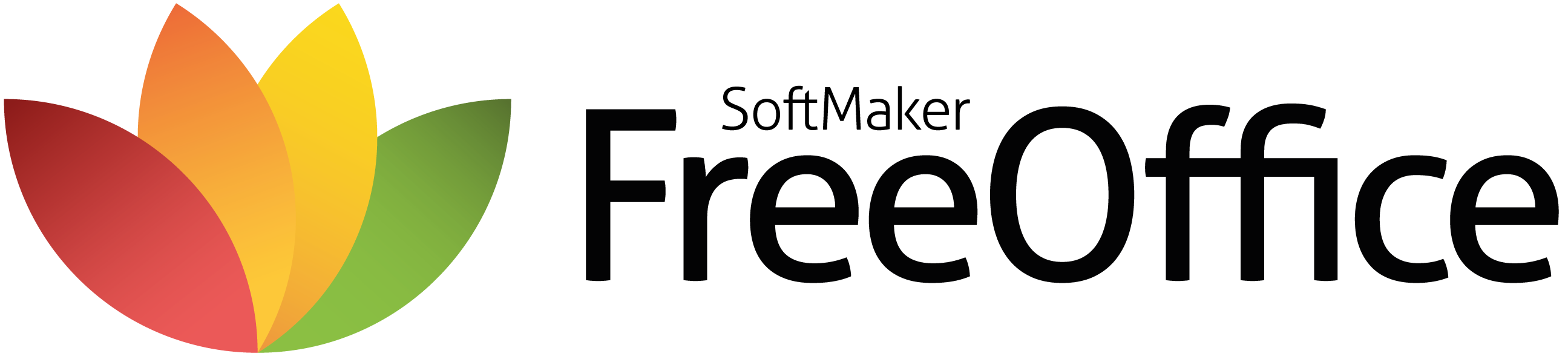
- Original author: SoftMaker
- Release: 1994; 32 years ago
- Stable release: 2024 rev 1222 / 30 November 2024
- Operating system: Windows 7 or later, macOS 10.12 or later, Linux, Android 5.0 or later, iOS 14
- License: Proprietary (freeware/registerware)
- Website: www.freeoffice.com

SoftMaker Office is an office suite which aims for compatibility with Microsoft Office. It is available as a one-time purchase, as well as a subscription. A freeware version with a slightly reduced feature set is released under the name SoftMaker FreeOffice.

It has been developed since 1987 by the German company SoftMaker.

== Components ==
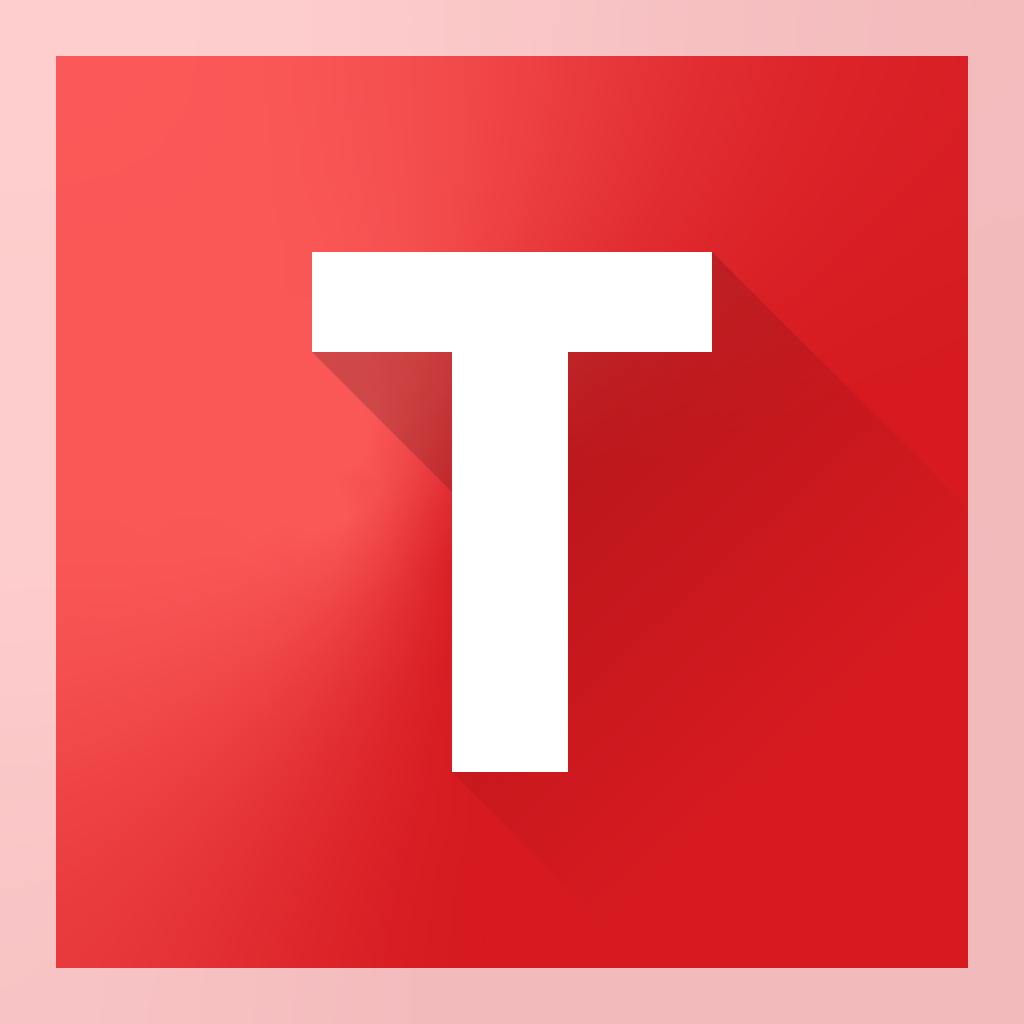
TextMaker
(word processor)

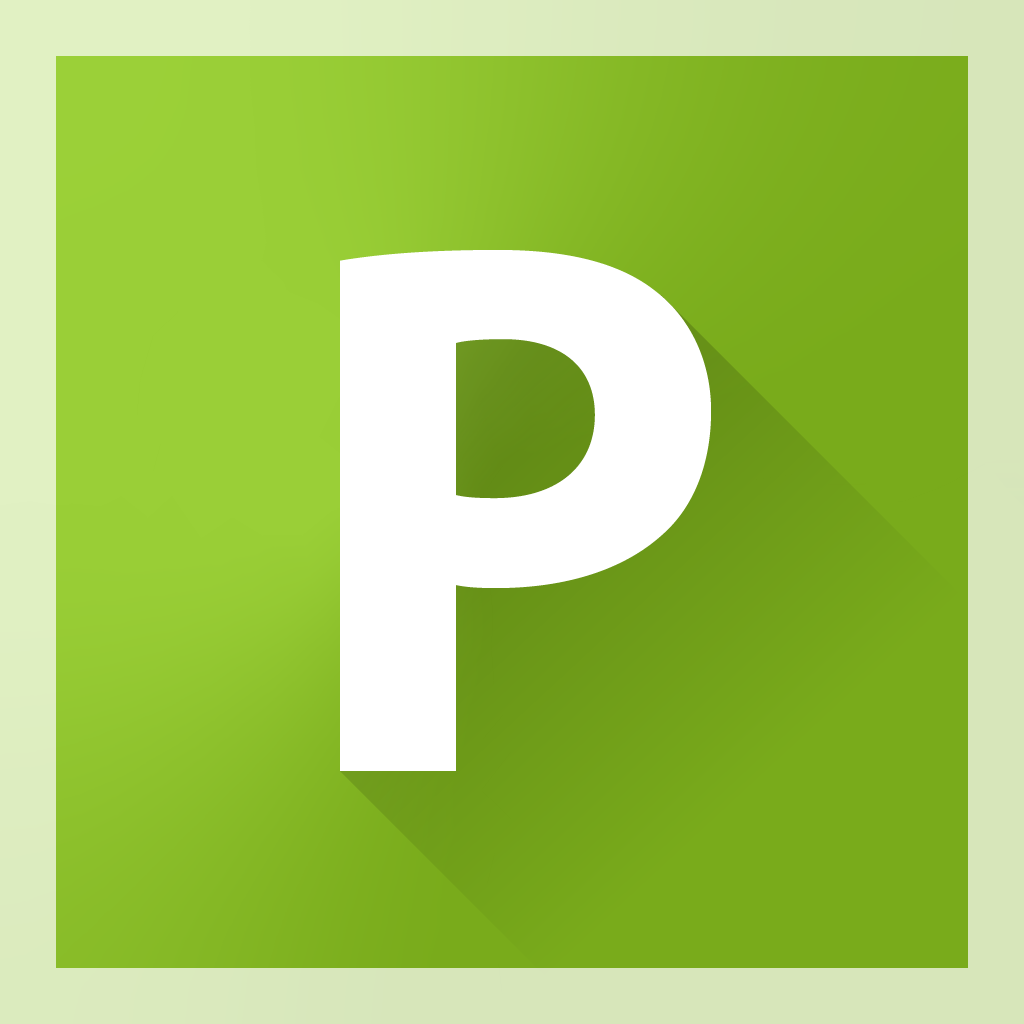
PlanMaker
(spreadsheet)

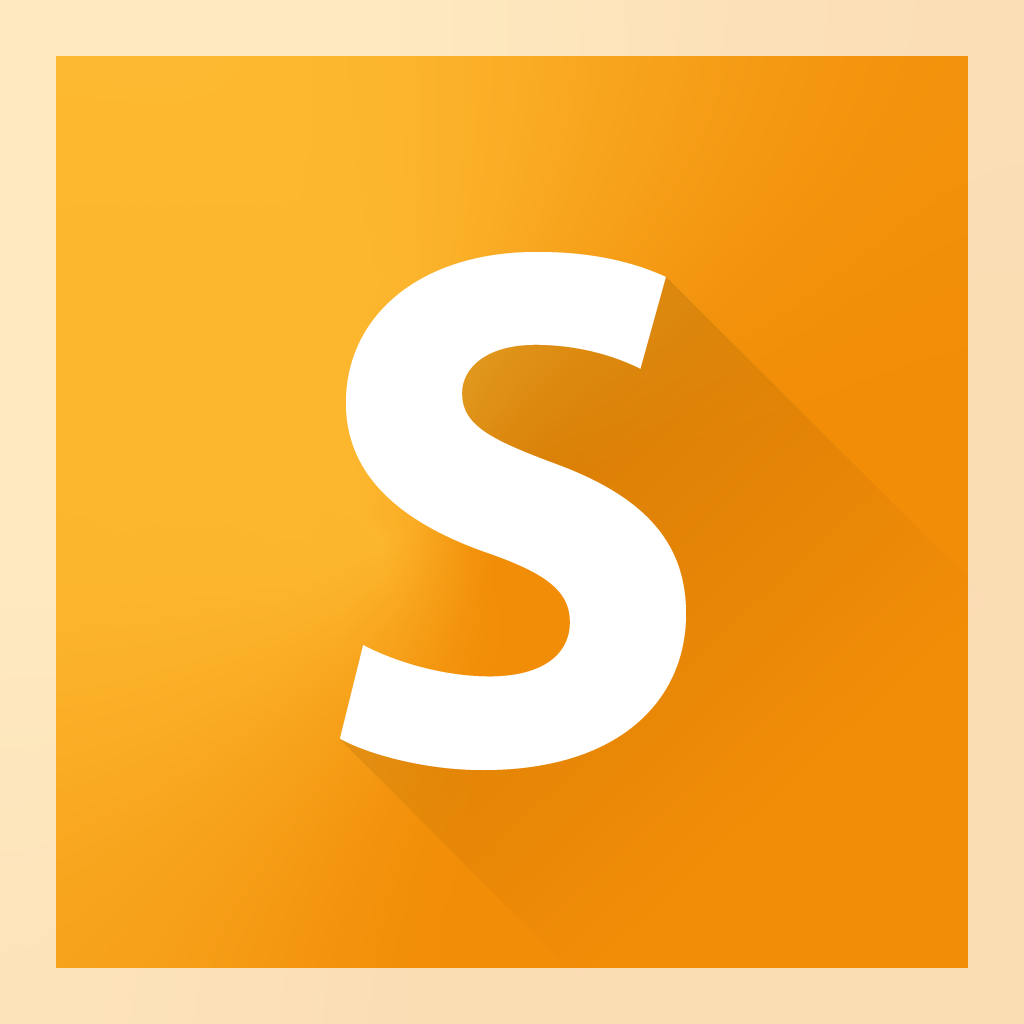
Presentations
(presentation graphics)

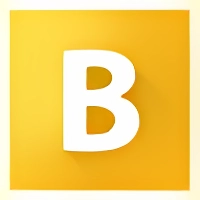
BasicMaker
(VBA-like macros, Windows only)

The versions Professional (purchase) and NX Universal (subscription) include:

- Support for Windows Group Policy
- ePUB export,
- Zotero integration
- Text summary and enhancement with ChatGPT (only subscription)
- Translations of whole documents with DeepL (only subscription)

== Functionality ==
SoftMaker Office has similar functionality to other office suites such as Microsoft Office or LibreOffice, and can also run from USB flash drives. Multi-language spell-checking, hyphenation and thesaurus is supported, and it has an integrated translation-dictionary for English, German, French, Italian, and Spanish. For German the Duden spell and grammar checker and dictionaries are included in the Professional version.

It can read and write file formats of Microsoft Office, OpenDocument (word processor only), RTF and HTML. Support for the OpenDocument spreadsheet (ODS) format was added in the Anniversary update released for SoftMaker Office 2018. It can export to PDF and ePUB.

The user interface utilized Ribbons similar to Microsoft Office, and there is an option to use old-school menus instead. A dark mode is available. Documents can be opened as tabs in a single window, to allow easy switching between multiple documents.

SoftMaker Office is also available for Android and iOS for both smartphones and tablets. It includes TextMaker, PlanMaker, and Presentations. These apps offer the full feature set of a desktop office suite with word processing, spreadsheets and presentation graphics on mobile devices.

== FlexiPDF ==
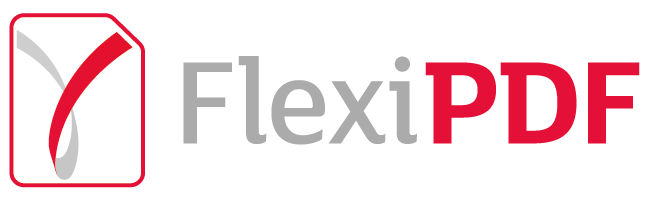
FlexiPDF Logo since 2024

The PDF editor FlexiPDF was first released in 2016. It has been described as a "text virtuoso" in the German press. Other functions include:

- Creation of PDF forms
- Text recognition for scanned pages
- PDF/A generation for archiving
- Cryptographic PDF signing
- Comparison of two PDF files
- Translation of entire pages with DeepL while retaining the layout

== Fonts ==
SoftMaker offers collections of TrueType fonts, web fonts and OpenType PS fonts. It is also licensing them for redistribution with other software.

== See also ==
- Comparison of office suites
- List of office suites
