= DataViz =

American software company, founded in 1984

DataViz, Inc.
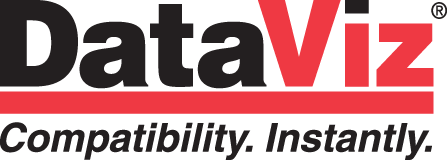
- Type: Private
- Industry: Software
- Founded: 1984; 42 years ago
- Headquarters: Westport, Connecticut, United States
- Products: DailyBalance, Docs To Go
- Website: dataviz.com

DataViz, Inc. is a software company based in Westport, Connecticut, founded in 1984. The company is best known for Documents To Go, a mobile office suite, and for MacLinkPlus, a file format conversion utility for Macintosh. It has also sold Passwords Plus, RoadSync, Conversions Plus and DailyBalance.

== History ==
DataViz was established in 1984 and built its reputation on file format conversion and document compatibility tools, initially for the Macintosh platform. MacLinkPlus allowed Mac users to open, convert and work with documents created in different applications or on different operating systems — a significant practical need during the 1980s and 1990s as file format standards remained fragmented.

The company later developed Documents To Go, a mobile office suite that allowed users to view and edit Microsoft Word, Excel and PowerPoint documents on Palm OS and later BlackBerry and other mobile devices. On 8 September 2010, DataViz sold the Documents To Go product and associated assets to Research In Motion for $50 million.
