= Thinkfree Office =

Commercial office suite

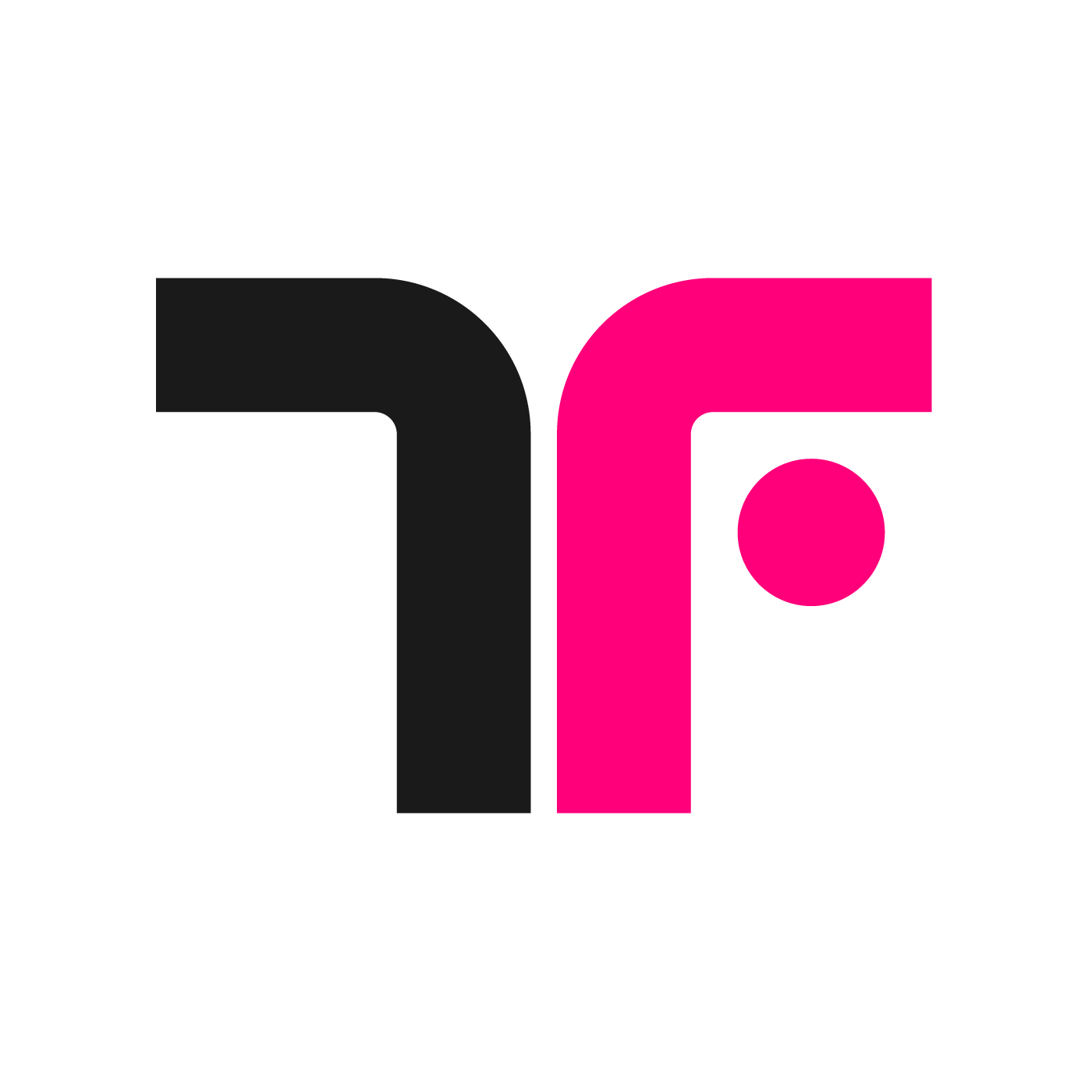
- Logo
- Developer: Thinkfree Inc.
- Initial release: 4 July 2000; 25 years ago
- Operating system: Online; read only: iOS, Android
- Platform: Web application
- Standards: Office Open XML, OpenDocument: ISO/IEC 26300-3:2015
- Available in: 14 languages
- List of languages Korean, English, German, French, Spanish (Spain), Spanish (United States), Italian, Japanese, Dutch, Portuguese, Russian, Thai, Chinese (simplified), Chinese (traditional).
- Type: Office suite, project management
- License: Proprietary
- Website: thinkfree.com

Thinkfree Office is a web-based commercial office productivity suite developed by South Korea-based Thinkfree Inc. It includes Word (a word processor), Spreadsheet (a spreadsheet) and Presentation (a presentation program).

They are compatible with Microsoft Office's Word, PowerPoint, and Excel. It also features collaborative editing. The product is hosted on the client's server.

== Supported file formats ==
Thinkfree Office supports ISO/IEC international standard ISO/IEC 26300 Open Document Format for Office Applications (odf, odt, odp, ods, odg). It also supports Microsoft's XML formats (docx, pptx, xlsx) and Microsoft's legacy binary formats (doc, ppt, xls).

== Naming ==
The software was previously marketed under different names, such as Thinkfree Server, Thinkfree Online, Hancom Office Online, and Hancom Office Web. Eventually, the brand was consolidated under the name Thinkfree Office.

== History ==
- In June 2000, Thinkfree Inc. released Thinkfree Office, based in Silicon Valley, California. It is recognized as the world's first online office editor (predating Google Docs and Microsoft 365) and attracted significant media coverage, including reports on CNN.
- In 2001, Microsoft CEO Steve Ballmer highlighted Thinkfree as a significant competitor in a magazine interview, considering it a potential threat to his company, second only to Linux.
- In November 2003, Hancom, a South Korean office software company, signed a memorandum of understanding and subsequently acquired Thinkfree.
- In January 2004, Thinkfree expanded into other foreign markets. Subsidiary Haansoft USA, Inc. was created in San Jose, California to begin formal commercial operations in the US market. At the same time, a partnership was established with Riverdeep with the purpose of improving marketshare.
- In February 2004, expansion into the Japanese market began. A commercial agency agreement was signed with PSI in Shinjuku, Japan, which allowed for localized distribution. In addition, a global agreement was entered into with Yamada Denki, one of the three main computer distributors in Japan, for a total of 180,000 units.
- In May 2006, Thinkfree Office received the "Product of the Year" award at the Well-Connected Awards, USA.
- In January 2009, Thinkfree Mobile was launched at CES 2009 in Las Vegas.
- In April 2009, Thinkfree Live, Korea's first web office service, was launched.
- In June 2018, a partnership was formed with Amazon Web Services to integrate Thinkfree Office into WorkDocs, an in-house office suite.
- In October 2023, Hancom split its online office business unit as "Thinkfree Inc.".
