= Canaima (operating system) =

Venezuelan Linux distribution

Canaima GNU/Linux
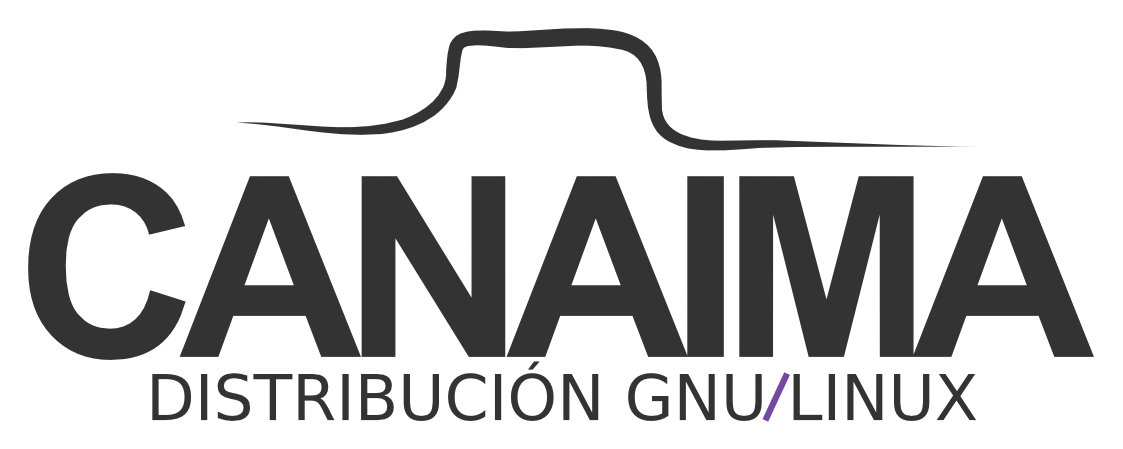

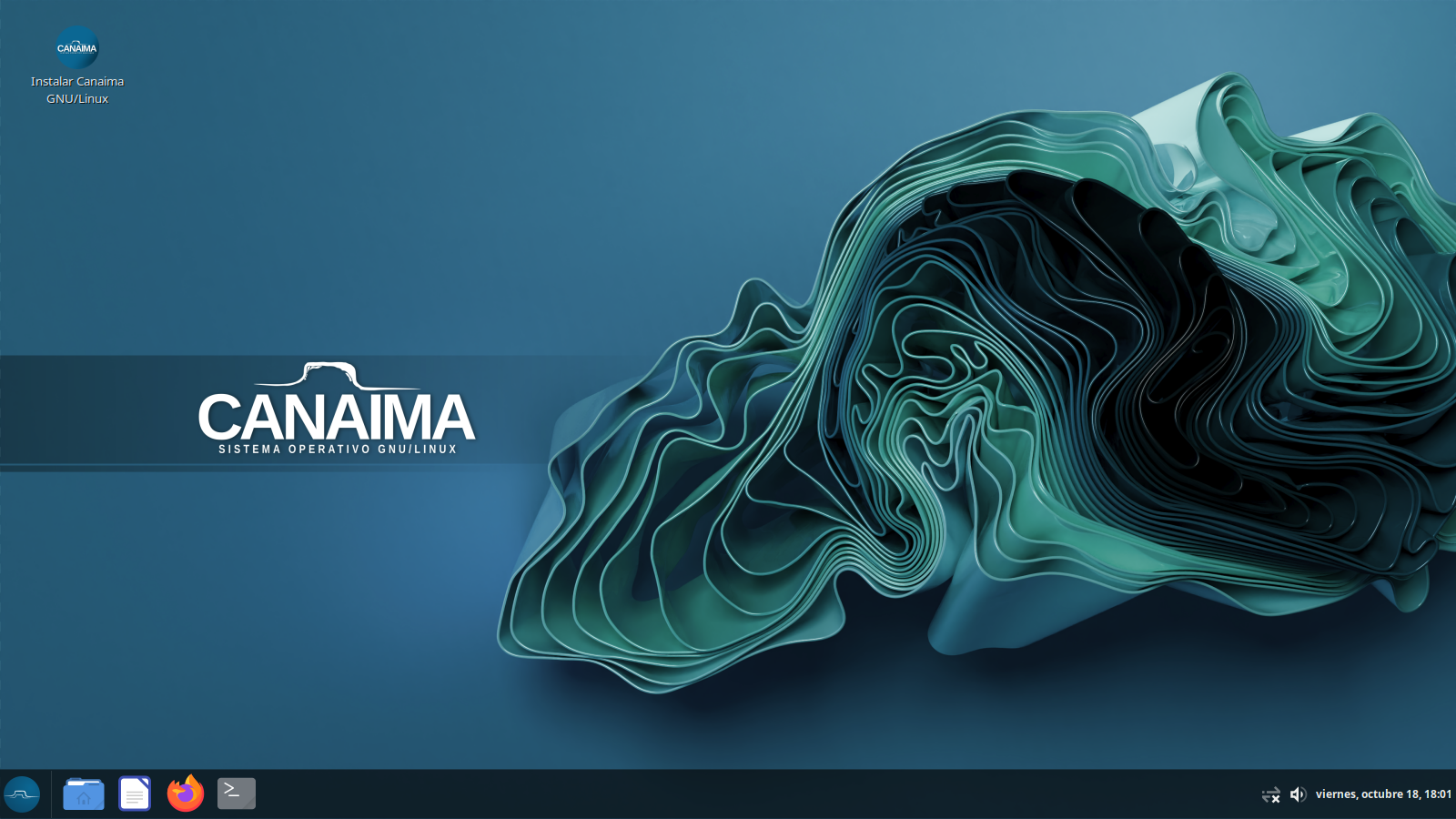
- Canaima 8.0 (Kavanayén) using Cinnamon
- Developer: CANTV / CNTI / CENTIDEL / Edelca / VIT / FUNDACITE / Free software community
- OS family: Unix-like (Linux kernel)
- Working state: Current
- Source model: Open source
- Initial release: 18 October 2007; 19 years ago
- Latest release: 8.0 / 18 October 2024; 2 years ago
- Available in: Venezuelan Spanish
- Update method: APT (several front-ends available)
- Package manager: dpkg
- Supported platforms: IA-32, x86-64
- Kernel type: Monolithic (Linux kernel)
- Userland: GNU
- Default user interface: GNOME, KDE Plasma and Xfce
- License: Free software licenses (mainly GPL)
- Official website: canaima.softwarelibre.gob.ve

Canaima GNU/Linux is a free and open-source Linux distribution that is based on the architecture of Debian. It was created as a solution to cover the needs of the Venezuelan Government as a response to presidential decree 3,390 that prioritizes the use of free and open source technologies in the public administration. On 14 March 2011, Canaima was officially established as the default operating system for the Venezuelan public administration.

The operating system has gained a strong foothold and is one of the most used Linux distributions in Venezuela, largely because of its incorporation in public schools. It is being used in large scale projects as "Canaima Educativo", a project aimed at providing school children with a basic laptop computer with educational software nicknamed Magallanes. Use of Canaima has been presented at international congresses about the use of open standards, Despite being a young development, it has been used on the Festival Latinoamericano de Instalación de Software Libre (FLISOL).

== Features ==
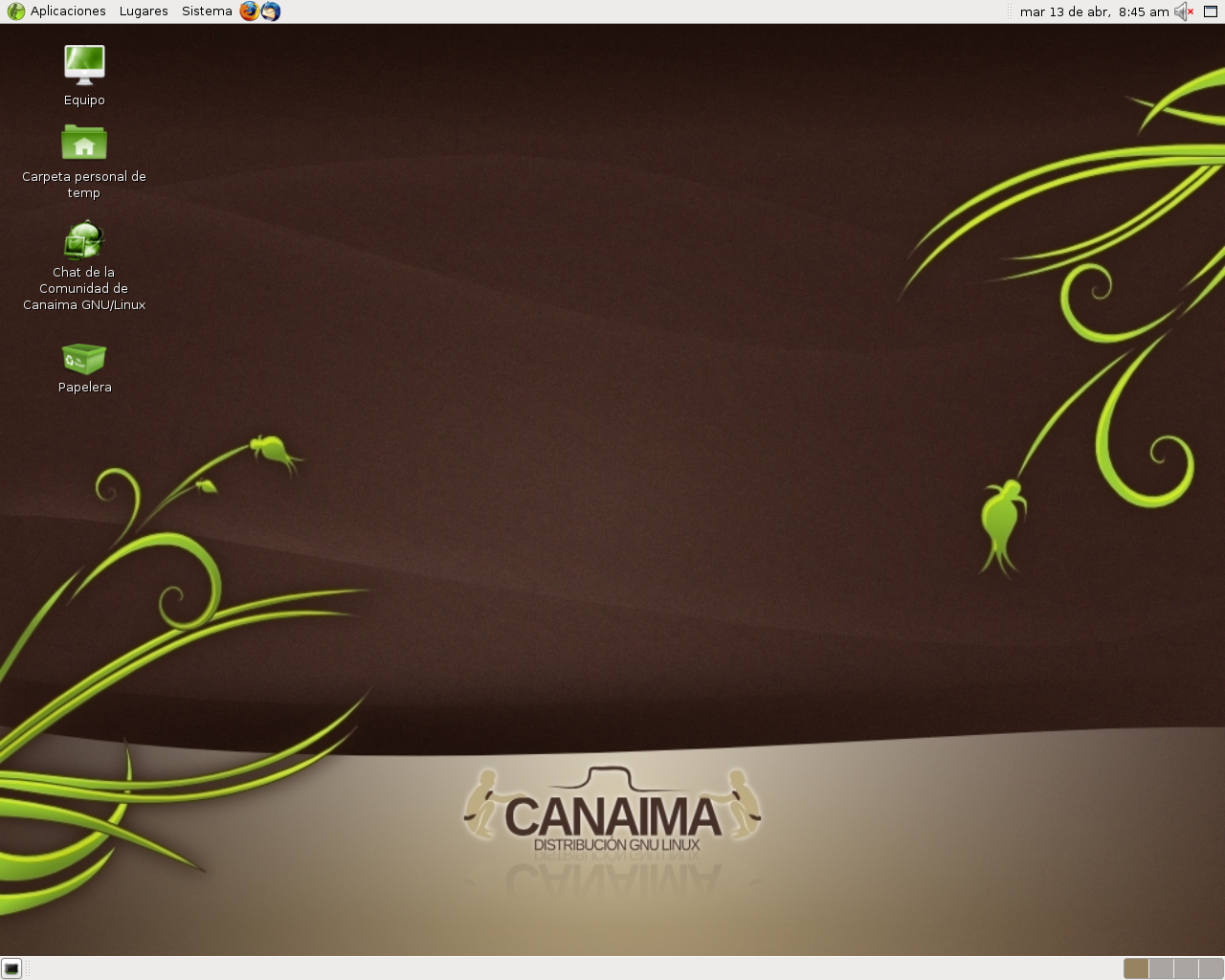
Desktop of Canaima 2.0

Some of the major features of Canaima GNU/Linux are:

1. Easy installation.
2. Software license cost is free.
3. Free distribution and use.

The Free Software Foundation (FSF) states that Canaima GNU/Linux is not 100% free software. This is because some of its components are non-free software, in particular some firmware that may be needed for some graphic cards, sound cards, printers, etc. Canaima creators opted to include these non-free drivers in order to support as many computers being used by the Venezuelan government as possible, and to facilitate the migration from a closed source operating system to an open-source one (although including non-free software). It is expected that Canaima, in its upcoming releases, offers an option in the installation process for non-free drivers to be optional, being able to install a 100% free software image of the distribution if the user choose to.

== Included software ==
Canaima includes applications for training, development and system configuration. The Graphical User Interface (GUI) and desktop environment by default is GNOME. There are other desktop environments and GUIs maintained by the community for the system, like KDE Plasma and Xfce.

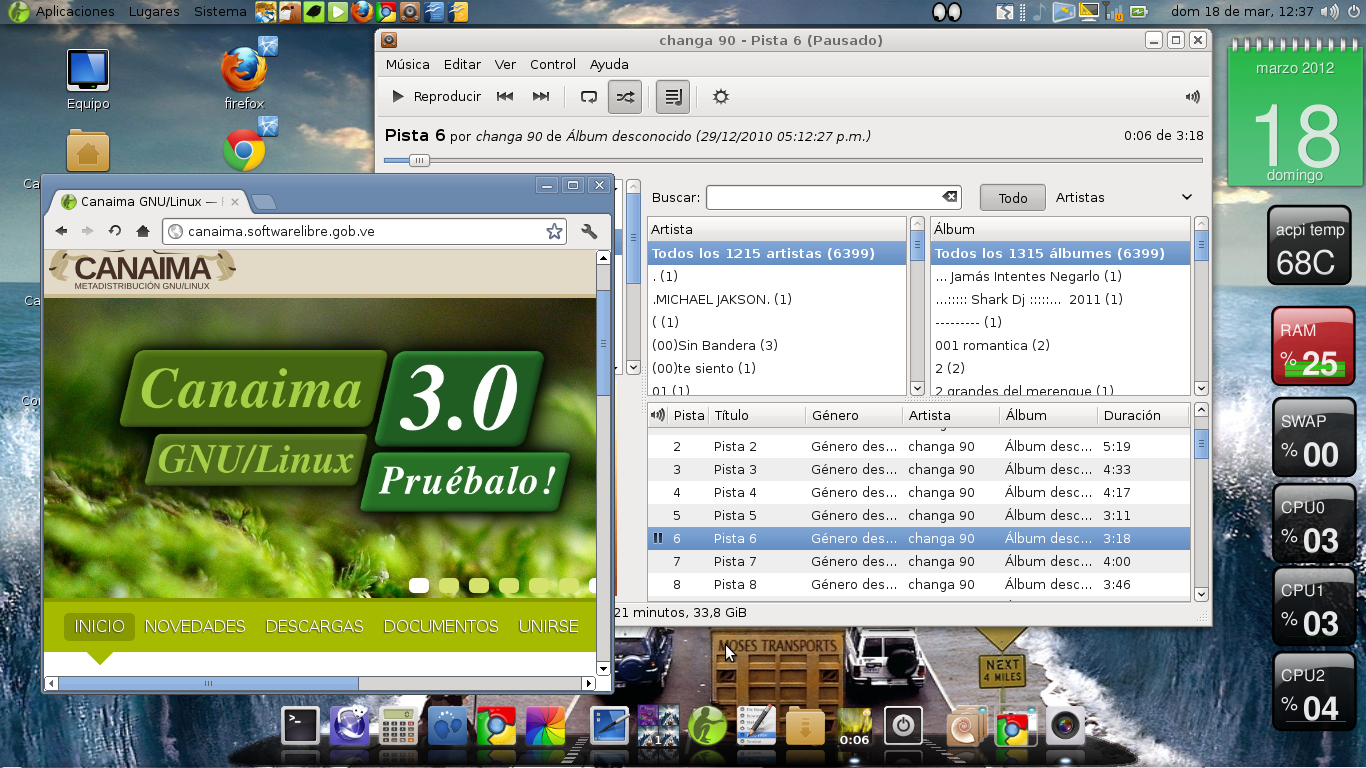
Personalized Canaima GNU/LINUX 3.0 desktop

Productivity: The office software suite LibreOffice, with word processor, spreadsheet, presentation program, it includes other more specific programs like project management software Planner and a HTML editor.

Internet: Includes the Cunaguaro browser, a web browser based on Iceweasel and adapted especially for Canaima 3.0 and onwards. Canaima Curiara, is a light web browser based on Cunaguaro, developed in python-webkit for specific applications on the distribution.

Graphics: Includes GIMP, Inkscape, desktop publishing software Scribus and gLabels labels designer.

The full list of included software can be found at here.

== Releases ==
Canaima has been releasing stable versions periodically since the last couple of years.

Version	Codename	Release date
1.0	Canaima	2007-10-18
2.0	Canaima	2009-02-05
2.0.1 RC1	Canaima	2009-04-16
2.0.1	Canaima	2009-05-15
2.0.2	Canaima	2009-05-22
2.0.3	Canaima	2009-07-03
2.0.4	Canaima	2009-10-17
2.1 RC	Canaima	2010-05-21
3.0 RC	Roraima	2011-02-10
3.0 RC2	Roraima	2011-02-22
3.0	Roraima	2011-05-05
3.1 VC1	Auyantepui	2011-12-29
3.1 VC2	Auyantepui	2012-07-06
3.1 VC3	Auyantepui	2012-07-18
3.1	Auyantepui	2012-11-14
4.0	Kerepakupai	2013-12-04
4.1	Kukenán	2014-09-04
5.0	Chimantá	2016-12-19
6.0	Kavac	2018-03-18
6.0.3	Kavac	2018-04-18
6.1.0	Kavac	2020-06-24
7.0	Imawarí	2022-08-19
Color	Significance	
Red	Older version, unsupported.	
Yellow	Older version, still supported.	
Green	Latest version.	
Blue	Future release.	

== Development Cycle ==
Canaima GNU / Linux has a development model based on Debian but with some modifications to adapt it to the specific needs of Venezuela; In this sense, a development cycle has been defined as follows:

The rolling release development model is used.

1. The socio-productive Community, APN and Universities: They provide packages, proposals or, failing that, the corrections of some flaws (bugs), in order to raise the community requirements for the next version of the distribution.

2. Building your own packages: For building packages, the debmake and debuild tools native to Debian are used.

3. Alpha Version: It is built and subjected to tests where the correct interaction between the Canaima repository and the distribution is evaluated. The theming of the new version is displayed, performance tests are carried out on high, medium and low-end machines, the performance and management of the most used applications in the National Public Administration (APN) are evaluated.

4. Evaluation: The Alpha version is evaluated by a group of workers from Venezuelan public institutions, related to the area of Science and Technology and some members of the Venezuelan Free Software Community. In parallel, the socio-productive community will carry out the packaging of its own packages to be added within the Beta 1 version.

5. Beta version 1: The previously selected packages are added to the system directly or to the repository together with the project packages. At this stage of the development cycle, the distribution is published for Project users.

6. Beta version 2: At this stage of the development cycle, more packages are added and errors are corrected, resulting in the correction of bugs previously reported during the community review of the Beta 1 version.

7. Publication: At this stage, after the evaluation and corrections of errors found, the new version is published for the use of the Canaima Project community.

== Cayapa Canaima ==
One of the community activities that has been generated around Canaima is the Cayapa. Cayapa is a Venezuelan term that stands as a form of cooperative work made by several people to reach one goal. On these meetings, free software developers get together to propose upgrades and fix bugs among other things; this activity is called a Bug Squash Party in other projects. The 6th Cayapa was conducted from 14 May until 15 May 2012 in the city of Barinas.

The last Cayapa was conducted from 12 November until 14 November 2014 in the city of Mérida, Venezuela.

== OEMs ==
Being a distribution promoted by the Venezuelan Government, a certain number of strategic agreements have been generated with several countries and manufacturing hardware companies:

- Portugal: Agreement for the manufacturing of 250,000 "Magalhães" computers to be distributed on public schools
- Sun Microsystems: for the certification of Canaima devices from this manufacturer.
- VIT, C.A.: Venezolana de Industria Tecnológica, mixed-enterprise between the Venezuelan state and Chinese entrepreneurs in which it established the use of Canaima on the devices that are manufactured.
- Lenovo: For the certification of devices from the manufacturer for the use of Canaima.
- Siragon, C.A.: Venezuelan manufacturer of computer equipment, an agreement from which Canaima is certified for use on their devices.

== Use of Canaima ==
The most successful instances of the use and adoption of Canaima:

=== Canaima Educativo ===
It is a project initiated in 2009 by the Venezuelan Ministry of Education (Ministerio del Poder Popular para la Educación) that provides students in primary education with a laptop computer, known as Canaimitas, with free software, using the Canaima operating system and a series of educational content created by the Ministry of Education.

In 2017, 6,000,000 laptops were acknowledged as being delivered.

=== CANTV ===
The national telephone company, CANTV, uses the operating system to a certain extent according to their Equipped Internet Plan.

== Variants ==
There are a number of Canaima editions, maintained and recognized by community activists, that are not released at the same time as the official distribution and do not take part in the project schedule. The most significant ones are:

- Canaima Colibri, a Venezuelan distribution with the goals of being friendly, light and functional for computers with low resources.
- Canaima Comunal, the idea behind this edition is that it can be extended by community councils, a form of community government called "Consejos Comunales". The main aim is to deliver an operating system to the people in these councils for their everyday work, including tools for surveys among others.
- Canaima Caribay, aimed at community media that has flourished because of government support, since the Venezuelan government sees most private media outlets as being heavily biased.
- GeoCanaima contains free Geomatics applications and data to perform various practices and interact with desktop applications, web servers and mapping generators.
- Canaima Forense, a new user-friendly environment containing a variety of useful tools for computer forensics.

== See also ==
- Astra Linux – a similar project by the Russian government
- Debian GNU/Linux
- GendBuntu – a similar project used by Gendarmerie in France
- Inspur
- LiMux – a similar project of the city council of Munich
- Linux adoption
- Nova (operating system) – a similar project by the Cuban government
- Red Flag Linux
- Red Star OS – a similar project by the North Korean government
- Ubuntu Kylin
- Unity Operating System
- VIT, C.A.
