= Astra Linux =

Russian Linux-based computer operating system

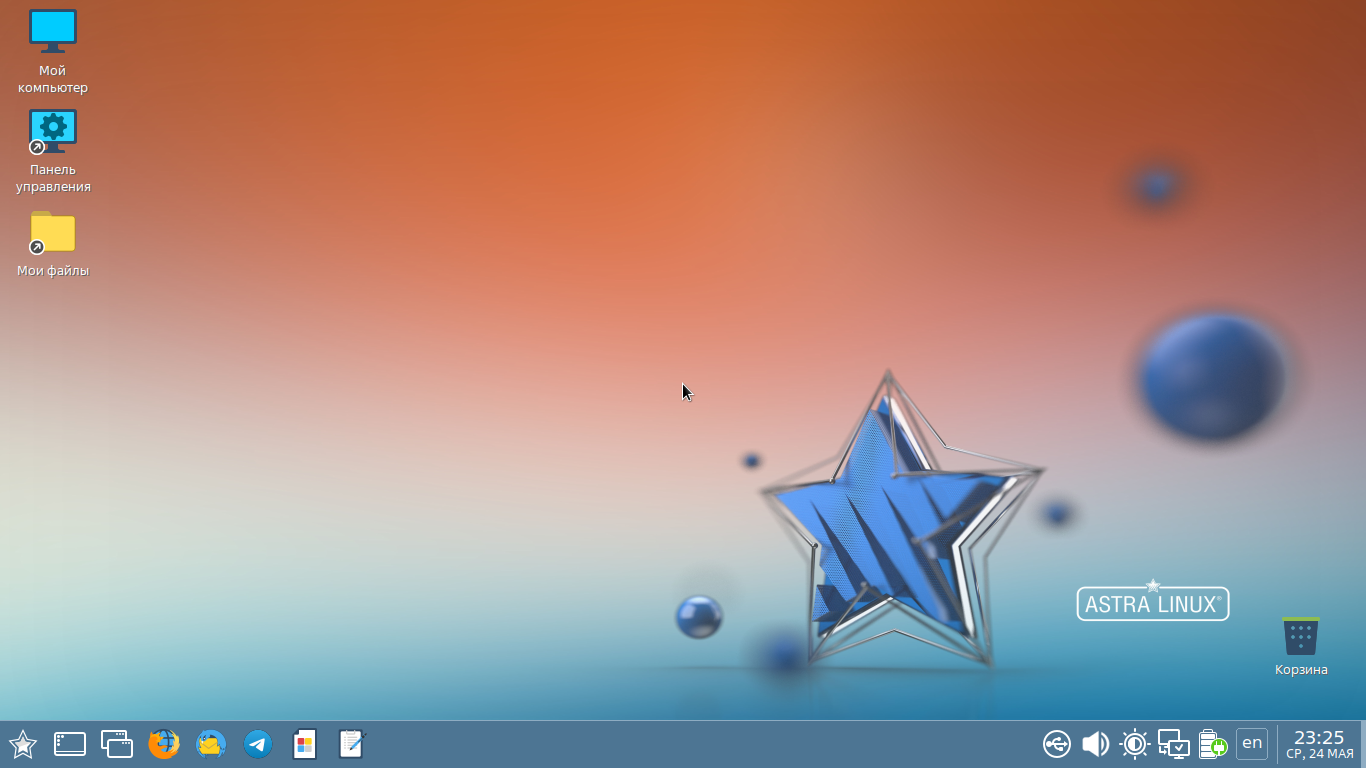
- Astra Linux Operating System
- Developer: Rusbitech-Astra
- OS family: Linux (Unix-like)
- Working state: Current
- Marketing target: Russian Armed Forces; Intelligence agencies of Russia; Police of Russia; RZD; Gazprom; Rosatom; Tianwan Nuclear Power Plant; State Institutions; Health Institutions; Educational Institutions and others
- Available in: Russian, English
- Update method: APT
- Package manager: dpkg
- Supported platforms: x86-64, ARM, Elbrus
- Kernel type: Monolithic
- Default user interface: Fly
- License: various
- Official website: astralinux.ru

Astra Linux is a Russian Linux-based computer operating system (OS) that is being widely deployed in the Russian Federation to replace Microsoft Windows. Initially it was created and developed to meet the needs of the Russian army, other armed forces and intelligence agencies. It provides data protection up to the level of "top secret" in Russian classified information grade by featuring mandatory access control. It has been officially certified by Russian Defense Ministry, Federal Service for Technical and Export Control and Federal Security Service.

In the course of the 2010s, as Russian authorities and industry were trying to lower dependence on Western products ("import substitution industrialization"). Aside from army and police, it is now being supplied to educational, healthcare and other state institutions, as well as to industry giants such as RZD, Gazprom, Rosatom and others. Server versions of Astra Linux are certified to work with Huawei equipment.

== Specifications ==
The creator of the OS is the Scientific/Manufacturing Enterprise Rusbitech which is applying solutions according to Russian Government decree No. 2299-р of 17 October 2010 that orders federal authorities and budget institutions to implement Free Software use.

The OS comes in two editions. Special Edition is a paid product available for x86-64, ARM and Elbrus processors. It is security-certified and provides three levels of protection, named after Russian cities: Oryol (the lowest), Voronezh and Smolensk (the highest).

The free Common Edition runs only on x86-64 and has no security certification, so it provides only the basic Oryol level.

Rusbitech also manufactures a "soft/hardware trusted boot control module" MAKSIM-M1 ("М643М1") with PCI bus. It prevents unauthorized access and offers some other raised digital security features. The module, besides Astra Linux, also supports OSes with Linux kernel 2.6.x up to 5.x.x, as well as several Microsoft Windows OSes.

It is declared the Astra Linux licenses correspond with Russian and international laws and "don't contradict with the spirit and demands of GPL license". The system uses .deb packages.

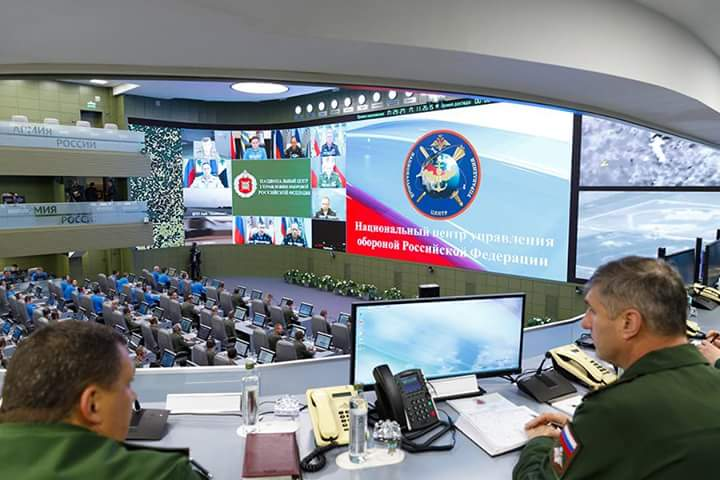
Astra Linux Special Edition being used in the Russian National Center for Defence Control

Astra Linux is a recognized Debian derivative. Rusbitech has partnership relations with The Linux Foundation. It was part of the advisory board of The Document Foundation, but was suspended on 26 February 2022 because of the Russian invasion of Ukraine.

== Use ==
The Special Edition version (paid) is used in many Russian state-related organizations. Particularly, it is used in the Russian National Center for Defence Control.

There are talks to deploy mass use of Astra Linux in many state institutions of the Republic of Crimea – legitimate use of other popular OSes is questionable because of international sanctions during the Russo-Ukrainian War.

Also there were plans on cooperation of Rusbitech and Huawei.

In January 2018, it was announced that Astra Linux was going to be deployed to all Russian Army computers, and Microsoft Windows will be dropped.

In February 2018, Rusbitech announced it has ported Astra Linux to Russian-made Elbrus microprocessors.

In February 2019, Astra Linux was announced to be implemented at Tianwan Nuclear Power Plant in China.

Since 2019 "super-protected" tablet computers branded MIG are available with Astra Linux, smartphones are expected.

In 2019 Gazprom national gas/oil holding announced Astra Linux implementation, in 2020 nuclear corporation Rosatom, in early 2021 Russian Railways was reported to do so.

In 2020, Astra Linux sold more than a million copies in licenses and generated 2 billion rubles in sales.

In 2021, several Russian nuclear power plants and subsidiaries of Rosatom are planned to switch to Astra Linux, with a total of 15000 users.

In July 2022 after Microsoft had decided to exit the Russian market, Astra Linux announced that it was planning to be publicly listed on the Moscow Exchange, although it did not supply a date for the planned listing at the time.

== Repository ==
Starting with the x.7 update, the Astra Linux Special Edition operating system uses a nested package repository structure – and this structure comprises the main repository, the base repository, and the extended repository. The main x.7 repository is generally identical to version 1.6 – and the base repository encompasses all core packages, as well as packages related to development tools.

The extended repository houses versions of software packages that are not found in the primary and base repositories. Such software operates within the Astra Linux environment, remains unaltered to incorporate security features with CSS, may not be compatible with packages from the base and main repositories, and does not undergo certification tests.

The extended repository offers more functionality than a basic and core repository, with extended repository packages capable of modifying basic packages but not core packages.

Additionally, the extended repository includes a backport's component that supplies the latest versions of packages that might not be compatible with packages from the basic and extended repositories, and an "Astra-ce component" that furnishes packages to ensure maximum compatibility with third-party software.

Using an extended repository enables users to install and run software originally designed for other Linux systems, develop their own software, and adapt Astra-Linux to various hardware platforms.

The primary categories of extended repository software packages are packages not included in the base repository, packages that update the base repository (i.e., newer versions of the basic repository packages – if incompatible, they are integrated into the backports component), and packages that substitute packages from the main repository. The latter are consolidated in the Astra-ce component, which includes: PostgreSQL DBMS, Exim (Exim4) email service, MariaDB DBMS packages, Java OpenJDK tools, and LibreOffice office suites.

== Version history ==
Versions of Astra Linux Special Edition
Version	Release date	Linux kernel
1.2	28 October 2011	2.6.34
1.3	26 April 2013	3.2.0
1.4	19 December 2014	3.16.0
1.5	8 April 2016	4.2.0
1.6	12 October 2018	4.15.0
1.7	22 October 2021	5.4
1.7.3	29 November 2022	5.15
1.7.5	16 October 2023	6.1
1.8	1 August 2024	6.6 or 6.1 LTS
1.8.2	30 June 2025	6.12 LTS
1.8.4	13 November 2025	6.12 LTS

Versions of Astra Linux Common Edition
Version	Release date	Linux kernel
1.5	ending of 2009	2.6.31
1.6	23 November 2010	—N/a
1.7	3 February 2012	2.6.34
1.9	12 February 2013	3.2.0
1.10	14 November 2014	3.16.0
1.11	17 March 2016	4.2.0
2.12	21 August 2018	4.15
2.12.29	14 May 2020	4.15.3-2
2.12.40	29 December 2020	5.4
2.12.43	8 September 2021	5.10
2.12.45	4 August 2022	5.15
2.12.46	18 April 2023	5.15

== See also ==
- Unity Operating System, a Linux distribution used on Chinese government computers
- List of Debian-based Linux distributions
- Debian Linux
- Ubuntu Kylin
- Linux adoption
- Red Flag Linux
- Canaima (operating system) – a similar project by the Venezuelan computer manufacturer VIT, C.A. and Chinese information technology company Inspur
- GendBuntu – a similar project used by Gendarmerie in France
- LiMux – a similar project of the city council of Munich
- Nova (operating system) – a similar project by the Cuban government
- Red Star OS – a similar project by the North Korean government
