= Ubuntu Kylin =

Chinese Linux distribution

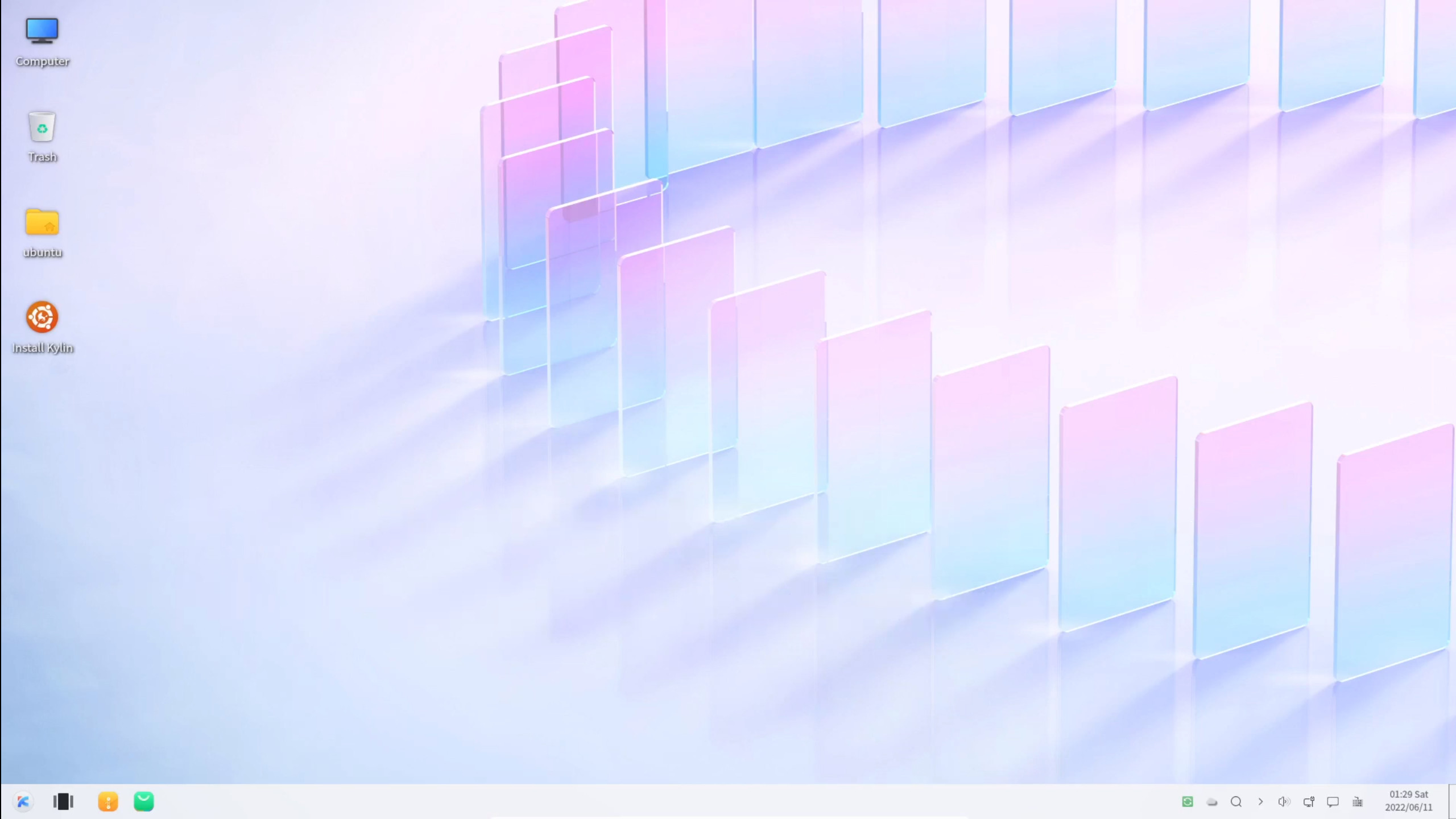
- Screenshot of the desktop of Ubuntu Kylin 22.04
- Developer: National University of Defense Technology, Canonical Ltd., Ubuntu Kylin Community
- OS family: Linux (Unix-like)
- Working state: Current
- Source model: Open-source
- Initial release: 25 April 2013; 13 years ago
- Latest release: 26.04 / 23 April 2026; 6 months ago
- Marketing target: Personal computers
- Available in: More than 55 languages by LoCos, presets to Simplified Chinese characters
- Update method: Software Updater, UKSC, APT
- Package manager: dpkg, APT, Snap, flatpak
- Supported platforms: x86-64; ARM64; ppc64le (POWER8 and later); s390x; ARMhf (ARMv7 + VFPv3-D16)
- Kernel type: Monolithic (Linux kernel)
- Userland: GNU
- Default user interface: UKUI (based on Qt)
- License: Free software + some proprietary device drivers
- Official website: ubuntukylin.com?lang=en

Ubuntu Kylin (Chinese: 优麒麟; pinyin: Yōu Qílín) is the official Chinese version of the Ubuntu computer operating system. It is intended for desktop and laptop computers, and has been described as a "loose continuation of the Chinese Kylin OS". In 2013, Canonical Ltd. reached an agreement with the Ministry of Industry and Information Technology to co-create and release an Ubuntu-based operating system with features targeted at the Chinese market.

The first official release, Ubuntu Kylin 13.04, was released on 25 April 2013, on the same day as Ubuntu 13.04 (Raring Ringtail). Features include Chinese input methods, Chinese calendars, a weather indicator, and online music search from the Dash.

== History ==
Version 20.04 introduced version 3.0 of its own, newly developed UKUI (Ubuntu Kylin User Interface). Formerly, UKUI was a customization of the MATE desktop.

Version 14.10 introduced the Ubuntu Kylin Software Center (UKSC), and a utility which helps end-users for daily computing tasks called Youker Assistant.

The team cooperates with Sogou to develop Sogou Input Method for Linux. Since it is closed source, it is not included in the official Ubuntu Kylin image, but users can download it from UKSC or Sogou's website.

WPS Office, also closed-source, is the default office suite in the pro and enhanced editions. LibreOffice However is used mainly as default in the official vanilla Ubuntu Kylin image from the main Ubuntu server website without WPS Office installed.

== Release history ==
Version	Code name	Release date	Supported until	Kernel version
13.04	Raring Ringtail	2013-04-25	2014-01-27	3.8
13.10	Saucy Salamander	2013-10-17	2014-07-17	3.11
14.04 LTS	Trusty Tahr	2014-04-17	2019-04	3.13
14.10	Utopic Unicorn	2014-10-23	2015-06	3.16
15.04	Vivid Vervet	2015-04-23	2016-01	3.19
15.10	Wily Werewolf	2015-10-22	2016-07	4.2
16.04 LTS	Xenial Xerus	2016-04-21	2021-04	4.4
16.10	Yakkety Yak	2016-10-14	2017-07	4.8
17.04	Zesty Zapus	2017-04-13	2018-01	4.10
17.10	Artful Aardvark	2017-10-20	2018-07	4.13
18.04 LTS	Bionic Beaver	2018-04-26	2023-04	4.15
18.10	Cosmic Cuttlefish	2018-10-18	2019-07	4.18
19.04	Disco Dingo	2019-04-19	2020-01	5.0
19.10	Eoan Ermine	2019-10-18	2020-07-17	5.3
20.04 LTS	Focal Fossa	2020-04-23	2025-04	5.4
20.10	Groovy Gorilla	2020-10-22	2021-07	5.8
21.04	Hirsute Hippo	2021-04-22	2022-01	5.11
21.10	Impish Indri	2021-10-14	2022-07	5.13
22.04 LTS	Jammy Jellyfish	2022-04-21	2025-04	5.15
22.10	Kinetic Kudu	2022-10-20	2023-07	5.19
23.04	Lunar Lobster	2023-04-21	2024-01	6.2
23.10	Mantic Minotaur	2023-10-12	2024-07	6.5
24.04 LTS	Noble Numbat	2024-04-25	2027-05	6.8
24.10	Oracular Oriole	2024-10-10	2025-07	6.11
25.04	Plucky Puffin	2025-04-17	2026-01	6.14
25.10	Questing Quokka	2025-10-10	2026-07-09	6.17
26.04	Resolute Raccoon	2026-04-23	2029-04	7.0
Old version Older version, still maintained Latest version

== See also ==
- BOSS Linux
- Kingsoft WPS Office
- Debian GNU/Linux
- Inspur
- Linux adoption
- Red Flag Linux
- Astra Linux – a similar project by the Russian government
- Unity Operating System
- Canaima (operating system) – a similar project by the Venezuelan computer manufacturer VIT, C.A. and Chinese information technology company Inspur
- GendBuntu – a similar project used by Gendarmerie in France
- LiMux – a similar project of the city council of Munich
- Nova (operating system) – a similar project by the Cuban government
- Red Star OS – a similar project by the North Korean government
