= LiMux =

Free and open-source software project of Munich

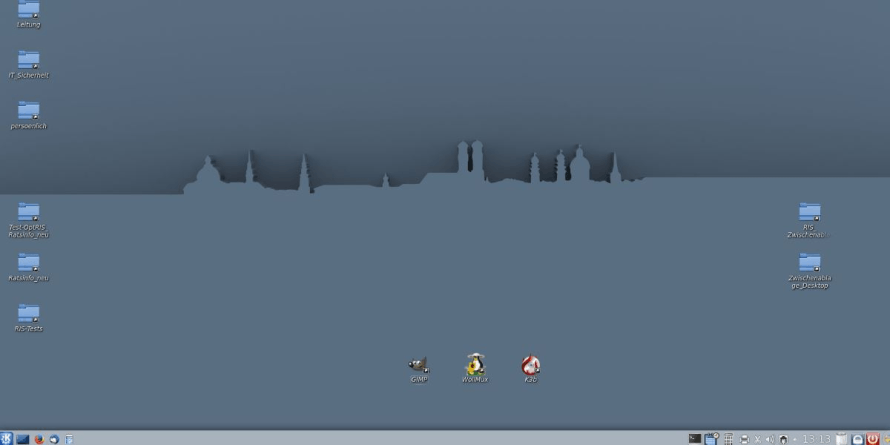
- Developer: LiMux Project
- OS family: Linux
- Working state: Current
- Source model: Combination of open source and closed source
- Initial release: 2006; 20 years ago
- Latest release: 6.0 / 2019; 7 years ago
- Available in: German
- Package manager: dpkg
- Kernel type: Monolithic (Linux)
- Default user interface: KDE Plasma 5
- License: Various free software licenses, plus proprietary
- Official website: Project Site

LiMux was a project launched by the city of Munich in 2004 in order to replace the software on its desktop computers, migrating from Microsoft Windows to free software based on Linux. By 2012, the city had migrated 12,600 of its 15,500 desktops to LiMux. In November 2017 Munich City Council resolved to reverse the migration and return to Microsoft Windows-based software by 2020. In May 2020, it was reported that the newly elected politicians in Munich, while not going back to the original plan of migrating to LiMux wholesale, would prefer Free Software for future endeavours.

The project initially used OpenOffice.org, but announced on 15 October 2012 that it would switch to LibreOffice. The city reported that due to the project, it had gained freedom in software decisions, increased security and saved €11.7 million (US$16 million).

LiMux was the first Linux desktop distribution certified for industry use (ISO 9241) by the Technical Inspection Association (German: Technischer Überwachungsverein). It was first based on Debian, but later changed to the most popular Debian derivative, Ubuntu. LiMux Client version 5.0 was released in November 2014, based on Ubuntu 12.04 LTS with KDE SC 4.12 as the desktop. The default office suite was LibreOffice 4.1. Mozilla Firefox and Mozilla Thunderbird were included in their Extended Support Release versions.

== History ==
In 2003 the impending end of Microsoft's support for Windows NT 4.0 led Munich City Council to commission a report on choices for a successor for use on its office computers. The report yielded two main alternatives, either migration to Windows XP or a move to a free and open source operating system based on Linux with an accompanying emphasis on web browsers as OS-neutral application clients.

A majority of Council members voted for the Linux-based solution, which was dubbed LiMux, referencing the M on Munich vehicle registrations and MUC, the code of International Air Transport Association (IATA) for Munich airport.

On 16 May 2007, the TÜV confirmed by a comprehensive certification process, the usability of the LiMux-based client as a user interface for interactive computer systems according to the ISO standard 9241–110.

The migration was interrupted in the summer of 2004, because the city wanted to investigate the legal implications of software patents. In late 2006, the actual migration began.

A tool called Wollmux was developed to extend OpenOffice capabilities in areas required by Munich Council, including managing consistent letterheads, form templates, saved blocks of standard text, document versioning and merging. Wollmux was released in May 2008.

In May 2009, 1800 workstations were converted to Linux, and 12,000 received OpenOffice. By October 2013, the city of Munich had migrated over 15,000 desktop PCs (of about 18,000 desktops) to Linux and OpenOffice.org. The usability project group interviewed users regularly to achieve a good fit to their needs.

In 2013, Microsoft had announced its intention to move its German headquarters to Munich in 2016. According to mayor Reiter, it was unrelated to the criticism he and deputy mayor Josef Schmid presented against the LiMux project.

In 2014, Munich deputy mayor, Josef Schmid, and mayor, Dieter Reiter, considered going back to Windows due to alleged productivity problems. However, Stefan Hauf, the spokesman of the Munich city council stated that the majority of issues stem from compatibility issues in OpenOffice, something which could be solved by switching to LibreOffice. Moreover, the head of municipal IT services, Karl-Heinz Schneider, stated that most things were fine, and they had managed saved some 10 million euros (more than 13 million dollars). He emphasized that the number of complaints and malfunctions had not exceeded the usual level for an organization of this size.

In 2016, Microsoft relocated its German headquarters to Munich.

In November 2017 Munich city council decided to revert to Windows by 2020 with all systems being replaced by Windows 10 counterparts. Some of the reasons cited were adoption and users being unhappy with the lack of software available for Linux. A report commissioned by Munich and undertaken by Accenture, found the most important issues were organizational.

In 2018, journalistic group Investigate Europe released a video documentary via German public television network ARD that claimed that the majority of city workers were satisfied with the operating system, with council members insinuating that the reversal was a personally motivated decision by mayor Dieter Reiter. Reiter denied that he had initiated the reversal in gratitude for Microsoft moving its German headquarters from Unterschleißheim back to Munich.

In May 2020, the recently elected coalition administration, formed by The Greens and the Social Democrats, decided that "Where it is technologically and financially possible", the city will emphasize use on open standards and free open-source licensed software. In October 2024, the City Government doubled down on this decision by implementing a five-point open-source plan, as well as, founding an Open Source Program Office. 200,000 Euros have been allocated to the OSPO for short-term positions of both municipal employees and external programmers.

== Objectives ==
The main goal was to achieve more independence from software distributors. The decision in 2003 had two components: to get free software running on most desktops, and to buy and develop web-based and platform independent (e.g. Java-based) business applications. A core goal was to reduce reliance of Microsoft-based software stacks and fund local developers to write replacement software.

== LiMux client software ==
LiMux Client 4.0 was released in August 2011, based on Ubuntu 10.04 LTS with KDE desktop 3.5. It included OpenOffice.org 3.2.1, Mozilla Thunderbird and Mozilla Firefox and other free software products.

LiMux Client version 5.0 was released in November 2014, based on Ubuntu 12.04 LTS with KDE SC 4.12 as the desktop. The default office suite was LibreOffice 4.1. Mozilla Firefox and Mozilla Thunderbird were included in their Extended Support Release versions.

LiMux Client Version 5.5 based on Ubuntu 14.04 LTS with KDE 4.14.3a, LibreOffice 4.15.23.0, and Firefox 24.8.1 (optional 45.5.1)

LiMux Client version 6.0 is based on Kubuntu 18, KDE 5.44, GIMP 2.10, LibreOffice 5.2.8, WollMux 18, Google Chrome 80 and Firefox 60 ESR and 68; Okular is used as a PDF viewer instead of Adobe Reader, which was discontinued for Linux. Like the previous versions, it was not multi-session capable. First rollout was done in April 2019 and is estimated to be fully rolled out in 2020.

== See also ==
- Linux adoption
- Astra Linux – a similar project by the Russian government
- Canaima (operating system) – a similar project by the Venezuelan computer manufacturer VIT, C.A. and Chinese information technology company Inspur
- GendBuntu – a similar project used by Gendarmerie in France
- Nova (operating system) – a similar project by the Cuban government
- OpenDesk – a productivity suite by the German government
- Red Star OS – a similar project by the North Korean government
- Pardus (operating system) a similar project by the Turkish government
- Ubuntu Kylin – a similar project by the Chinese government
- Unity Operating System – a similar project by the Chinese government
