= Síragon =

Síragon, C.A.
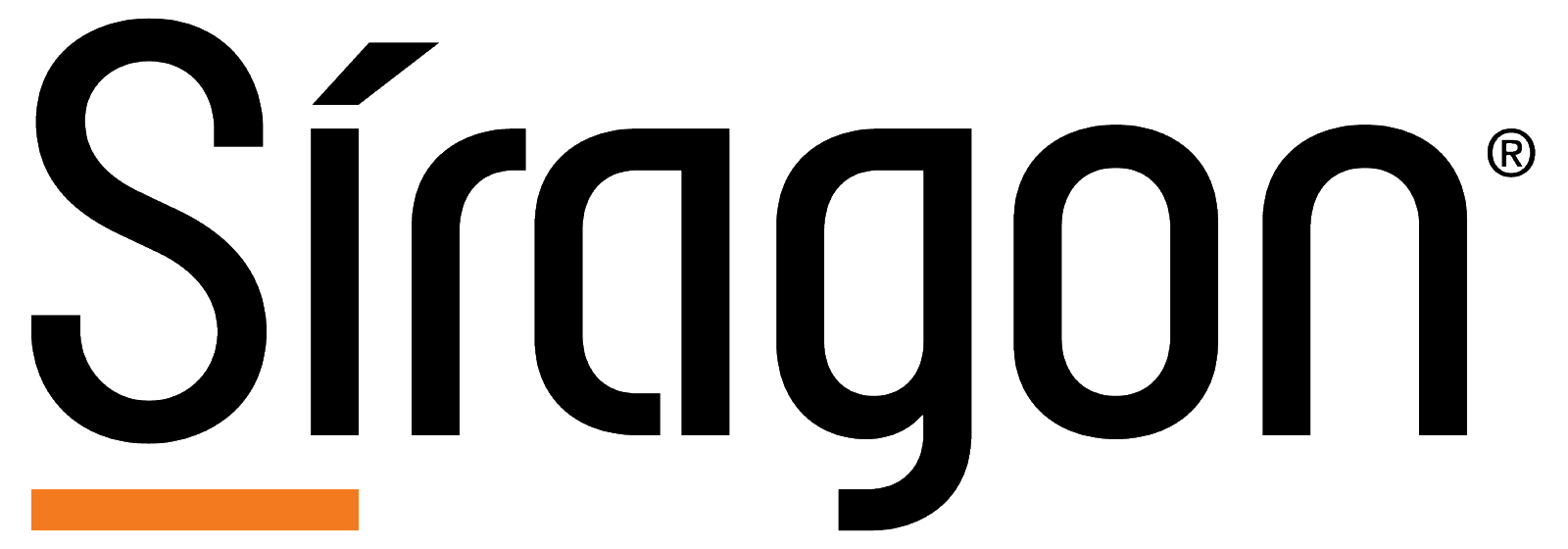
- Type: Private company
- Industry: Computer hardware
- Founded: 2003
- Headquarters: Zona Industrial Norte (North Industrial Zone), Valencia, Carabobo State, Venezuela
- Key people: Passan Yusef, CEO
- Products: Video cameras, Digital cameras, Desktop Computers, Netbooks, Laptop computers, Home appliances, Air conditioning
- Website: Síragon Webpage (in Spanish)

Síragon, C.A. is a Venezuelan manufacturer and assembler of computer hardware and other electronic products such as digital cameras, tablet, computers and LCD televisions. Siragon also designs and manufactures its own RAM and flash memory and printed circuit boards. The company was created in an alliance between Venezuela and Japanese investors. Its plant is located in the North Industrial Zone of Valencia, Carabobo, in Venezuela.

In November 2009, Síragon started to distribute its product line in Argentina, Allied with the Argentinian computer wholesale vendor Greentech. Síragon manufactures its own designs and also builds under license, all-in-one computers from Brazilian Itautec.

Siragon products are all manufactured in Venezuela. At the 2012 international consumer electronics show Siragon formally announced its intent to enter the US market by the end of 2012. Siragon is engaged in a design partnership with BMW for which it both manufactures electronics for and collaborates on electronic designs with.

Siragon currently holds the third largest share of the electronics market in Venezuela.

== Products ==
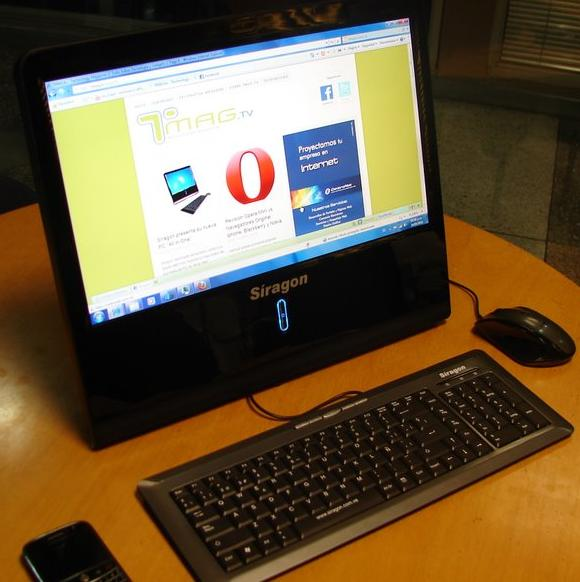
Siragon touchscreen computer / LED television

- Digital cameras
- Video cameras
- Desktop computers
- Laptop computers
- Netbooks
- Computer servers
- LCD televisions and monitors
- LED television
- Plasma TV screens
- Sound systems
- Peripherals
- Tablet computers
