= VIT, C.A. =

Computer hardware manufacturer in Venezuela with ties to PRC

Venezolana de Industria Tecnológica, C.A.
- Company type: State-Owned Enterprise (Public)
- Industry: Computer hardware
- Founded: 4 October 2005
- Headquarters: Paraguana´s Tax Free Zone, Falcon State, Venezuela
- Products: Laptop Computer
- Revenue: ▲$ ? billion (2006)
- Operating income: ▲$ ? billion (2006)
- Net income: ▼$ ? billion (2006)
- Number of employees: ??? (2006)
- Parent: Venezuelan government Inspur
- Subsidiaries: Venezuelan government

VIT, C.A. (Venezolana de Industria Tecnológica, Compañía Anónima) is a Venezuelan manufacturer of desktop computers and laptops, supported by the Venezuelan government and a Chinese information technology company Inspur (former Langchao (浪潮, tides)). The first computer they produced was called Computador Bolivariano (English: Bolivarian Computer), which came with the Kubuntu Linux operating system.

Since April 28, 2009, VIT computers are pre-installed with Canaima GNU/Linux.

By 2015, the second production line was expanded, which increased the assembly capacity of servers and computers by 150,000 units.

== See also ==
- Canaima (operating system)
- GendBuntu
- Inspur
- LiMux
- Nova (operating system)
- Ubuntu Kylin
