= GendBuntu =

Linux distribution for French police

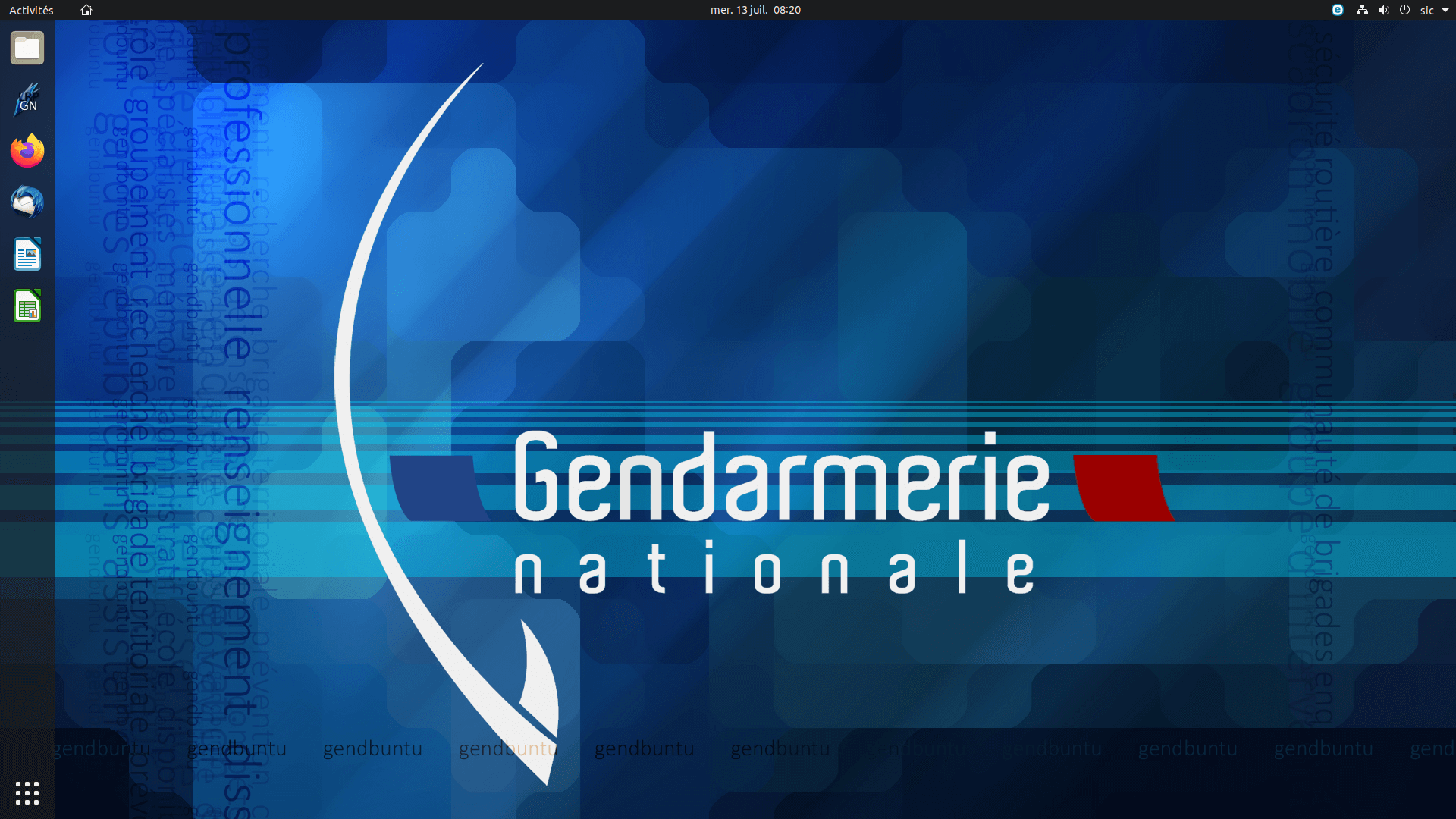
- Developer: National Gendarmerie
- OS family: Linux (Unix-like)
- Working state: Current
- Source model: Open source and proprietary software
- Initial release: 2008
- Latest release: 24.04 LTS / December 2024; 1 year ago
- Available in: French
- Package manager: APT
- Kernel type: Monolithic (Linux)
- Default user interface: GNOME
- License: Various free software licenses, plus proprietary
- Official website: www.gendarmerie.interieur.gouv.fr

GendBuntu is a version of Ubuntu adapted for use by France's National Gendarmerie. The Gendarmerie pioneered the use of open source software on servers and personal computers in 2005 when it adopted the OpenOffice.org office suite, making the OpenDocument .odf format its nationwide standard.

== Project ==
The GendBuntu project derives from Microsoft's decision to end the development of Windows XP, and its inevitable replacement with Windows Vista or a later edition of Windows on government computers. This meant that the Gendarmerie would have incurred large expenses for staff retraining if it had continued to use proprietary software.

One of the main aims of the GendBuntu project was for the organisation to become independent from proprietary software distributors and editors, and achieve significant savings in software costs (estimated to be around two million euros per year).

Around 90% of the 10,000 computers purchased by the Gendarmerie per year are bought without an operating system, and have GendBuntu installed by the Gendarmerie's technical department.

The main goal was to migrate 80,000 computers by the end of 2014, a date which coincided with the end of support for Microsoft Windows XP. 35,000 GendBuntu desktops and laptops had been deployed as of November 2011.

A major technical problem encountered during the development of the project was keeping the existing computer system online while the update took place, not only in metropolitan France but also in overseas Departments and Regions. It was solved partly by redistributing dedicated servers or workstations local area networks (depending on the number of employees working on each LAN) and with the use of an ITIL-compliant qualifying process.

An IT support team helped to implement the changes. This included the "core team" at Gendarmerie headquarters at Issy-les-Moulineaux and the "running team" of four located at the Gendarmerie data center at Rosny-sous-Bois.

== Timeline ==
- 2004 - OpenOffice.org software replaces 20,000 copies of the Microsoft Office suite on Gendarmerie computers, with the transfer of all 90,000 office suites being completed in 2005.
- 2006 - Migration begins to the Mozilla Firefox web browser, on 70,000 workstations, and to the Mozilla Thunderbird email client. The Gendarmerie follows the example of the Ministry of Culture in this decision. Other software follows, such as GIMP.
- 2008 - The decision is made to migrate to Ubuntu on 90% of the Gendarmerie's computers by 2016. Ubuntu is installed on 5,000 workstations installed all over the country (one on each police station's LAN), primarily for training purposes.
- 2009 - Nagios supervision begins
- 2010 - 20,000 computers ordered without a pre-installed operating system
- January 2011 - Beginning of the large scale phasing in of GendBuntu 10.04 LTS
- December 2011 - 25,000 computers deployed with GendBuntu 10.04 LTS
- February 2013 - Upgrade from GendBuntu 10.04 LTS to GendBuntu 12.04 LTS. The local management and IT support teams will phase in the upgrade in such a way to not disrupt the running of the police stations.
- May 2013 - Target for end of the migration to GendBuntu 12.04 LTS - 35,000 computers upgraded.
- December 2013 - 43,000 computers deployed with GendBuntu 12.04 LTS. TCO lowered by 40%.
- February 2014 - Beginning of final stage of the migration of existing Windows XP computers to GendBuntu 12.04 LTS
- June 2014 - Migration completed. 65,000 computers deployed with GendBuntu 12.04 LTS (total number of computers : 77,000)
- March 2017 - Migration completed. 70,000 computers deployed with GendBuntu 14.04 LTS (total number of computers: 82,000)
- May 2017 - Introduction of GendBuntu 16.04 LTS
- June 2018 - 82% of PC workstations running GendBuntu 16.04 LTS
- Early June 2019 - 90% of workstations running GendBuntu (approx. 77,000)
- Spring 2019 - Migration to GendBuntu 18.04
- Early 2021 - Upgrade to GendBuntu 20.04
- April 2021 - Modernisation of the Gendbuntu workstations to become more nomad (Intranet/Internet). Creation of the Ubiquity project
- May 2023 - Upgrade to Gendbuntu 22.04
- May 2023 to June 2024 - Migration of the network from GendBuntu 20.04 to GendBuntu 22.04 (62,000 stations)
- June 2024 - 97% of workstations running GendBuntu (103,164 stations)
- December 2024 - Upgrade to Gendbuntu 24.04

== See also ==
- Ubuntu Kylin
- Astra Linux – a similar project by the Russian government
- Unity Operating System
- Canaima (operating system) – a similar project by the Venezuelan computer manufacturer VIT, C.A. and Chinese information technology company Inspur
- LiMux – a similar project of the city council of Munich
- Nova (operating system) – a similar project by the Cuban government
- Red Star OS – a similar project by the North Korean government
