= Linux adoption =

Usage of Linux as operating system of choice

Operating systems based on Linux, also called Linux distributions, have been adopted by households, nonprofit organizations, businesses, and governments.

Android, which runs on Linux, is the world's most widely used computer operating system. As of October 2024, Android has 45% of the global operating system market followed by Windows with 26%. Notably, Android uses a customized Linux kernel with a separate runtime environment and software stack compared to the vast majority of other Linux-based systems.

Linux runs on almost every type of device, all the top 500 most powerful supercomputers in the world, desktop computers, laptops, the International Space Station, smartphones, smartwatches, TVs, and cars. Additional large systems like The New York Stock Exchange, the Pentagon, and social media platforms like Facebook, YouTube, and X (formerly Twitter) all run on Linux. Microsoft's cloud service depends on Linux.

In August 2010, Jeffrey Hammond, principal analyst at Forrester Research, declared, "Linux has crossed the chasm to mainstream adoption," a statement attested by the large number of enterprises that had transitioned to Linux during the late-2000s recession. In a company survey completed in the third quarter of 2009, 48% of surveyed companies reported using an open-source operating system.

The Linux Foundation regularly releases publications regarding the Linux kernel, Linux OS distributions, and related themes. One such publication, "Linux Adoption Trends: A Survey of Enterprise End Users," is freely available upon registration.

== Linux adopters ==
Outside of traditional web services, Linux powers many of the biggest Internet properties (e.g., Google, Amazon, Facebook, eBay, Twitter or Yahoo!).

== Hardware platforms with graphical user interface ==
Linux is used on desktop computers, servers and supercomputers, as well as other devices like embedded computers such as the Raspberry Pi and Arduino. Additionally, Linux powers the Steam Deck's operating system, SteamOS, which was created by Valve, and has many distributions/versions, such as Arch Linux, Fedora Linux, and Ubuntu.

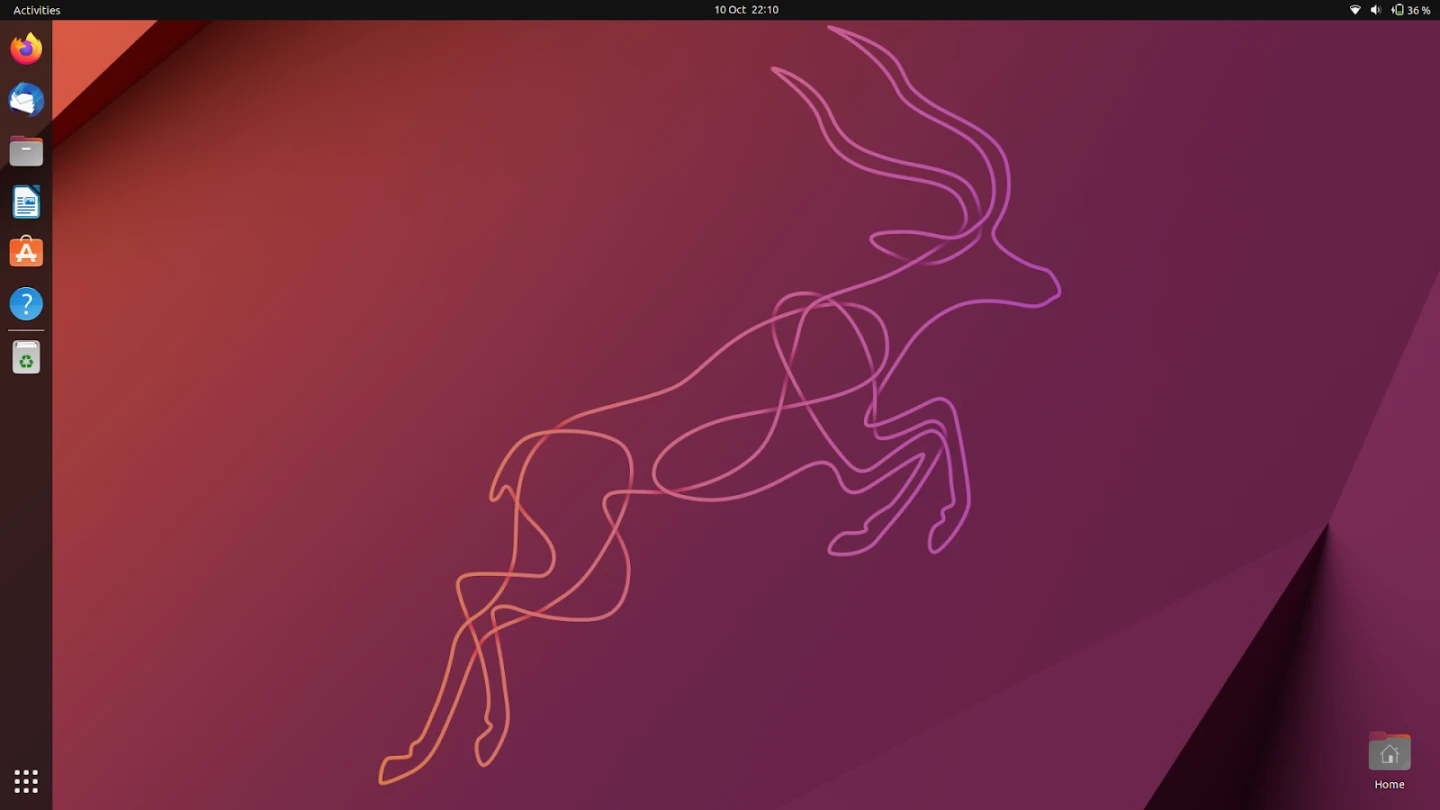
Ubuntu, a popular distribution of Linux

=== Measuring desktop adoption ===
Because Linux desktop distributions are not usually distributed by retail sale, there are no sales numbers that indicate the number of users. One downloaded file may be used to create many CDs and each CD may be used to install the operating system on multiple computers. On the other hand, the file might be used only for a test and the installation erased soon after. Due to these factors estimates of current Linux desktop often rely on webpage hits by computers identifying themselves as running Linux. The use of these statistics has been criticized as unreliable and as underestimating Linux use.

Using webpage hits as a measure, until 2008, Linux accounted for only about 1% of desktop market share, while Microsoft Windows operating systems held more than 90%. This might have been because Linux was not seen at that time as a direct replacement for Windows.

As of February 2017, W3Counter estimated "Linux" web browser market share to be 4.63%, while "Android" versions 6, 5 and 4 combined (which is based on the Linux kernel) were estimated to be 33.77%.

The Unity game engine gathers user statistics and showed in March 2016 0.4% Linux users. Similarly, the Steam client tracks usage and reported in September 2025 up to 2.9% of users on the platform were running some type of Linux-based distribution. This is up from around 1% in May 2015.

In April 2009, Aaron Seigo of KDE indicated that most web-page counter methods produce Linux adoption numbers that are far too low given the system's extensive penetration into non-North American markets, especially China. He stated that the North American-based web-measurement methods produce high Windows numbers and ignore the widespread use of Linux in other parts of the world. In estimating true worldwide desktop adoption and accounting for the Windows-distorted environment in the US and Canada he indicated that at least 8% of the world desktops run Linux distributions and possibly as high as 10–12% and that the numbers are rising quickly. Other commentators have echoed this same belief, noting that competitors are expending a lot of effort to discredit Linux, which is incongruent with a tiny market share:

I don't believe that the desktop Linux market share is barely 1%. I think it is a lot higher. I have no good data to share; I base my assessment on experience and knowing the industry. There is something else that is even more persuasive, and that is how Microsoft behaves. If Linux is so insignificant, why do they pay so much attention to it?

— Carla Schroder, Linux Today

In May 2009, Preston Gralla, contributing editor to Computerworld.com, in reacting to the Net Applications web hit numbers showing that Linux use was over 1%, said that "Linux will never become an important desktop or notebook operating system". He reasoned that the upsurge in Linux desktop use recently seen was due to Linux netbooks, a trend he saw as already diminishing and which would be further eroded when Windows 7 became available (and indeed, Linux netbooks did fall by the wayside, though whether they were solely responsible for the upsurge in Linux usage is open to question). He concluded: "As a desktop operating system, Linux isn't important enough to think about. For servers, it's top-notch, but you likely won't use it on your desktop – even though it did finally manage to crack the 1% barrier after 18 years".

In 2009, Microsoft then-CEO Steve Ballmer indicated that Linux had a greater desktop market share than Mac, stating that in recent years Linux had "certainly increased its share somewhat". Just under a third of all Dell netbook sales in 2009 had Linux installed.

Caitlyn Martin, researching retail market numbers in the summer of 2010 also concluded that the traditional numbers mentioned for Linux desktop adoption were far too low:

It seems like almost every day someone in the tech press or someone commenting in a technical forum will claim that Linux adoption on the desktop (including laptops) is insignificant. The number that is thrown around is 1%. These claims are even repeated by some who advocate for Linux adoption. Both the idea that Linux market share on the desktop is insignificant and the 1% figure are simply false and have been for many years...Where does the 1% number come from? There are two sources: very old data and web counters. The problem with using web counters to try and ascertain market share is that they generally only include websites that have paid to be counted. That pretty much guarantees that Windows will be overcounted.

— Caitlyn Martin

=== Reasons for adoption ===
Reasons to change from other operating systems to Linux include better system stability, better malware protection, low or no cost, that most distributions come complete with application software and hardware drivers, simplified updates for all installed software, free software licensing, availability of application repositories and access to the source code. Linux desktop distributions also offer multiple desktop workspaces, greater customization, free and unlimited support through forums, and an operating system that doesn't slow down over time. Environmental reasons are also cited, as Linux operating systems usually do not come in boxes and other retail packaging, but are downloaded via the Internet. The lower system specifications also mean that older hardware can be kept in use instead of being recycled or discarded. Linux distributions also get security vulnerabilities patched much more quickly than non-free operating systems and improvements in Linux have been occurring at a faster rate than those in Windows.

A report in The Economist in December 2007 said:

Linux has swiftly become popular in small businesses and the home. That’s largely the doing of Gutsy Gibbon, the code-name for the Ubuntu 7.10 from Canonical. Along with distributions such as Linspire, Mint, Xandros, OpenSUSE and gOS, Ubuntu (and its siblings Kubuntu, Edubuntu and Xubuntu) has smoothed most of Linux’s geeky edges while polishing it for the desktop. No question, Gutsy Gibbon is the sleekest, best integrated and most user-friendly Linux distribution yet. It’s now simpler to set up and configure than Windows.

Further investments have been made to improve desktop Linux usability since that 2007 report.

In many nations where proprietary operating systems such as Microsoft Windows can be easily obtained for free due to widespread software piracy, Linux distributions are often adopted based on their merits rather than on price.

Indian bulk computer purchaser the Electronics Corporation of Tamil Nadu (ELCOT) started recommending only Linux in June 2008. Following testing they stated: "ELCOT has been using SUSE Linux and Ubuntu Linux operating systems on desktop and laptop computers numbering over 2,000 during the past two years and found them far superior as compared to other operating systems, notably the Microsoft Windows Operating System."

In January 2001, Microsoft then-CEO Bill Gates explained the attraction of adopting Linux in an internal memo that was released in the Comes vs Microsoft case. He said:

Our most potent Operating System competitor is Linux and the phenomena around Open Source and free software. The same phenomena fuels competitors to all of our products. The ease of picking up Linux to learn it or to modify some piece of it is very attractive. The academic community, start up companies, foreign governments and many other constituencies are putting their best work into Linux.

=== Barriers to adoption ===
The greatest barrier to Linux desktop adoption is probably that few desktop PCs come with it from the factory. A.Y. Siu asserted in 2006 that most people use Windows simply because most PCs come with Windows pre-installed; they didn't choose it. Linux has much lower market penetration because in most cases users have to install it themselves, a task that is beyond the capabilities of many PC users: "Most users won’t even use Windows restore CDs, let alone install Windows from scratch. Why would they install an unfamiliar operating system on their computers?"

TechRepublic writer Jack Wallen expands on this barrier, saying in August 2008:

Why would anyone choose Windows over Linux?...In my seriously biased opinion, I think this question is answered with a simple conspiracy theory: Microsoft is doing everything it can to keep the public blind to Linux. Think about it? Remember the whole Wintel conspiracy where MS and Intel played off of each other to continue their strangle-hold monopoly in the PC industry? That era played a huge part in the blinding of consumers. Top that with the business practices MS forces upon big box shops to ensure their operating system is sold on nearly every PC sold and you can see that conspiracy is more of a reality than one might think.

Linus Torvalds stated, in his June 2012 interaction with students at Aalto University, that although Linux was originally conceived as a desktop system, that has been the only market where it has not flourished. He suggested that the key reason that keeps Linux from getting a substantial presence in the desktop market is that the average desktop user does not want to install an operating system, so getting manufacturers to sell computers with Linux pre-installed would be the missing piece to fulfill the vision of Linux in the desktop market. He added that Chromebooks, by shipping with the Linux-based ChromeOS, could provide the key turning point in such a transition, much like Android allowed Linux to spread in the mobile space.

In September 2012, GNOME developer Michael Meeks also indicated that the main reason for the lack of adoption of Linux desktops is the lack of manufacturers shipping computers with it pre-installed, supporting Siu's arguments from six years earlier. Meeks also indicated that users wouldn't embrace desktop Linux until there is a wider range of applications and developers won't create that wider range of applications until there are more users, a classic Catch-22 situation.

In an openSUSE survey conducted in 2007, 69.5% of respondents said they dual booted a Microsoft Windows operating system in addition to a Linux operating system. In early 2007 Bill Whyman, an analyst at Precursor Advisors, noted that "there still isn't a compelling alternative to the Microsoft infrastructure on the desktop."

Application support, the quality of peripheral support, and end user support were at one time seen as the biggest obstacles to desktop Linux adoption. According to a 2006 survey by The Linux Foundation, these factors were seen as a "major obstacle" for 56%, 49%, and 33% of respondents respectively at that time.

=== Application support ===
The November 2006 Desktop Linux Client Survey identified the foremost barrier for deploying Linux desktops was that users were accustomed to Windows applications which had not been ported to Linux and which they "just can't live without". These included Microsoft Office, Adobe Photoshop, Autodesk AutoCAD, Microsoft Project, Visio and Intuit QuickBooks. This creates a chicken or the egg situation where developers make programs for Windows due to its market share, and consumers use Windows due to availability of said programs. In a DesktopLinux.com survey conducted in 2007, 72% of respondents said they used ways to run Windows applications on Linux.

51% of respondents to the 2006 Linux Foundation survey, believed that cross-distribution Linux desktop standards should be the top priority for the Linux desktop community, highlighting the fact that the fragmented Linux market is preventing application vendors from developing, distributing and supporting the operating system. In May 2008, Gartner predicted that "version control and incompatibilities will continue to plague open-source OSs and associated middleware" in the 2013 timeframe.

By 2008, the design of Linux applications and the porting of Windows and Apple applications had progressed to the point where it was difficult to find an application that did not have an equivalent for Linux, providing adequate or better capabilities.

An example of application progress can be seen comparing the main productivity suite for Linux, OpenOffice.org, to Microsoft Office. With the release of OpenOffice.org 3.0 in October 2008 Ars Technica assessed the two:

Although OpenOffice.org has not yet reached full parity with Microsoft Office, it is maturing at a rapid pace and is already capable of meeting the basic needs of many average computer users. It is an ideal choice for schools and is an increasingly viable choice for small businesses and home users that don't rely on the more advanced capabilities of Microsoft's office suite.

==== Peripheral support ====
In the past the availability and quality of open source device drivers were issues for Linux desktops. Particular areas which were lacking drivers included printers as well as wireless and audio cards. For example, in early 2007, Dell did not sell specific hardware and software with Ubuntu 7.04 computers, including printers, projectors, Bluetooth keyboards and mice, TV tuners and remote controls, desktop modems and Blu-ray drives, due to incompatibilities at that time, as well as legal issues.

By 2008, most Linux hardware support and driver issues had been adequately addressed. In September 2008, Jack Wallen's assessment was:

Years ago, if you wanted to install Linux on a machine you had to make sure you hand-picked each piece of hardware or your installation would not work 100 percent...This is not so much the case now. You can grab a PC (or laptop) and most likely get one or more Linux distributions to install and work nearly 100 percent. But there are still some exceptions; for instance, hibernate/suspend remains a problem with many laptops, although it has come a long way.

==== End-user support ====
Some critics have stated that compared to Windows, Linux is lacking in end-user support. Linux has traditionally been seen as requiring much more technical expertise. Dell's website described open source software as requiring intermediate or advanced knowledge to use. In September 2007, the founder of the Ubuntu project, Mark Shuttleworth, commented that "it would be reasonable to say that this is not ready for the mass market."

In October 2004, Chief Technical Officer of Adeptiva Linux, Stephan February, noted at that time that Linux was a very technical software product, and few people outside the technical community were able to support consumers. Windows users are able to rely on friends and family for help, but Linux users generally use discussion boards, which can be uncomfortable for consumers.

In 2005, Dominic Humphries summarized the difference in user tech support:

Windows users are more or less in a customer-supplier relationship: They pay for software, for warranties, for support, and so on. They expect software to have a certain level of usability. They are therefore used to having rights with their software: They have paid for technical support and have every right to demand that they receive it. They are also used to dealing with entities rather than people: Their contracts are with a company, not with a person. Linux users are in more of a community. They don't have to buy the software, they don't have to pay for technical support. They download software for free & use Instant Messaging and web-based forums to get help. They deal with people, not corporations.

More recently critics have found that the Linux user support model, using community-based forum support, has greatly improved. In 2008 Jack Wallen stated:

With Linux, you have the support of a huge community via forums, online search, and plenty of dedicated websites. And of course, if you feel the need, you can purchase support contracts from some of the bigger Linux companies (Red Hat and Novell, for instance).

However, when you use the peer support inherent in Linux, you do take a chance with time. You could have an issue with something, send out email to a mailing list or post on a forum, and within 10 minutes be flooded with suggestions. Or these suggestions could take hours or days to come in. It seems all up to chance sometimes.

Yet generally speaking, most problems with Linux have been encountered and documented, so the chances are good you'll find your solution fairly quickly.

In addressing the question of user support, Manu Cornet said:

One of the great assets of the Open Source community (and Linux in particular), is that it's a real community. Users and developers really are out there, on web forums, on mailing lists, on IRC channels, helping out new users. They're all happy to see more and more people switch to Linux, and they're happy to help them get a grip on their new system...you'll find literally thousands of places where nice people will answer you and walk you out of your problem most of the time

==== Other factors ====
Linux's credibility has also been under attack at times, but as Ron Miller of LinuxPlanet points out:

...the fact that Linux is being criticized is probably a good thing.

First of all, it shows that Linux is making headway in the enterprise and beginning to have an impact on competitors and they are reacting to that. Secondly, it's healthy to take a long look at any solution and analyze its strengths and weaknesses and the economic ramifications of one choice over another.

Ultimately, consumers and decision makers need to look carefully at the data including the sources of the data and the criticism and decide if Linux is the right decision, but as more people choose Linux and it finds its place in the market, it is bound to wear a target. That's simply the price you pay for success in the marketplace.

There is continuing debate about the total cost of ownership of Linux, with Gartner warning in 2005 that the costs of migration may exceed the cost benefits of Linux. Gartner reiterated the warning in 2008, predicting that "by 2013, a majority of Linux deployments will have no real software total cost of ownership (TCO) advantage over other operating systems." However, in the Comes v. Microsoft lawsuit, Plaintiff's exhibit 2817 revealed that Microsoft successfully lobbied Gartner for changing their TCO model in favour of Microsoft in 1998. Organizations that have moved to Linux have disagreed with these warnings. Sterling Ball, CEO of Ernie Ball, the world's leading maker of premium guitar strings and a 2003 Linux adopter, said of total cost of ownership arguments: "I think that's propaganda...What about the cost of dealing with a virus? We don't have 'em...There's no doubt that what I'm doing is cheaper to operate. The analyst guys can say whatever they want."

In the SCO–Linux disputes, the SCO Group had alleged that UNIX source code donated by IBM was illegally incorporated into Linux. The threat that SCO might be able to legally assert ownership of Linux initially caused some potential Linux adopters to delay that move. The court cases bankrupted SCO in 2007 after it lost its four-year court battle over the ownership of the UNIX copyrights. SCO's case had hinged on showing that Linux included intellectual property that had been misappropriated from UNIX, but the case failed when the court discovered that Novell and not SCO was the rightful owner of the copyrights. During the legal process, it was revealed that SCO's claims about Linux were fraudulent and that SCO's internal source code audits had shown no evidence of infringement.

A rival operating system vendor, Green Hills Software, has called the open source paradigm of Linux "fundamentally insecure".

The US Army does not agree that Linux is a security problem. Brigadier General Nick Justice, the Deputy Program Officer for the Army's Program Executive Office, Command, Control and Communications Tactical (PEO C3T), said in April 2007:

Our job is to provide accurate and timely information to the soldier in the field so they can perform their mission. Open source software is part of the integrated network fabric which connects and enables our command and control system to work effectively, as people's lives depend on it. When we rolled into Baghdad, we did it using open source. It may come as a surprise to many of you, but the U.S. Army is "the" single largest install base for Red Hat Linux. I'm their largest customer.

=== Netbooks ===
In 2008, Gartner analysts predicted that mobile devices like Netbooks with Linux could potentially break the dominance of Microsoft's Windows as operating system provider, as the netbook concept focuses on OS-agnostic applications built as Web applications and browsing. Until 2008 the netbook market was dominated by Linux-powered devices; this changed in 2009 after Windows XP became available as option. One of the reasons given was that many customers returned Linux-based netbooks as they were still expecting a Windows-like environment, despite the netbook vision: a web-surfing and web-application device.

=== Thin clients ===
In 2011, Google introduced the Chromebook, a thin client running the Linux-based ChromeOS, with the ability to use web applications and remote desktop in to other computers running Windows, Mac OS X, a traditional Linux distribution or ChromeOS, using Chrome Remote Desktop. In 2012 Google and Samsung introduced the first version of the Chromebox, a small-form-factor desktop equivalent to the Chromebook.

By 2013, Chromebooks had captured 20–25% of the sub-$300 US laptop market.

By 2014, Google launched App Runtime for Chrome (ARC), which allowed certain Android apps to be run, it was no longer a thin client.

By 2020, Chromebook's market share was 10.8%, placing it above the Mac platform; having found success in education markets.

Dell created the ThinLinux operating system for the Wyse series of products. It is based on SLES 12, and it is made as an alternative to Dell's ThinOS operating system.

HP created the ThinPro operating system. It provides a filesystem that is locked, and encrypted for hardened security. It also has support for hardware-based BIOS protection.

Lenovo created the LeTOS operating system. It has the ability to be managed with the Lenovo LTM management software.

Stratodesk NoTouch is an operating system based on Linux that is designed for thin clients. It has the ability to be installed on a variety of platforms, instead of being specific to a specific vendor's hardware. This includes PCs, laptops, and embedded single-board computers, such as the Raspberry Pi. It includes support for healthcare authentication features, such as Imprivata SSO, FUS, and fingerprint authentication.

=== Mobile devices ===
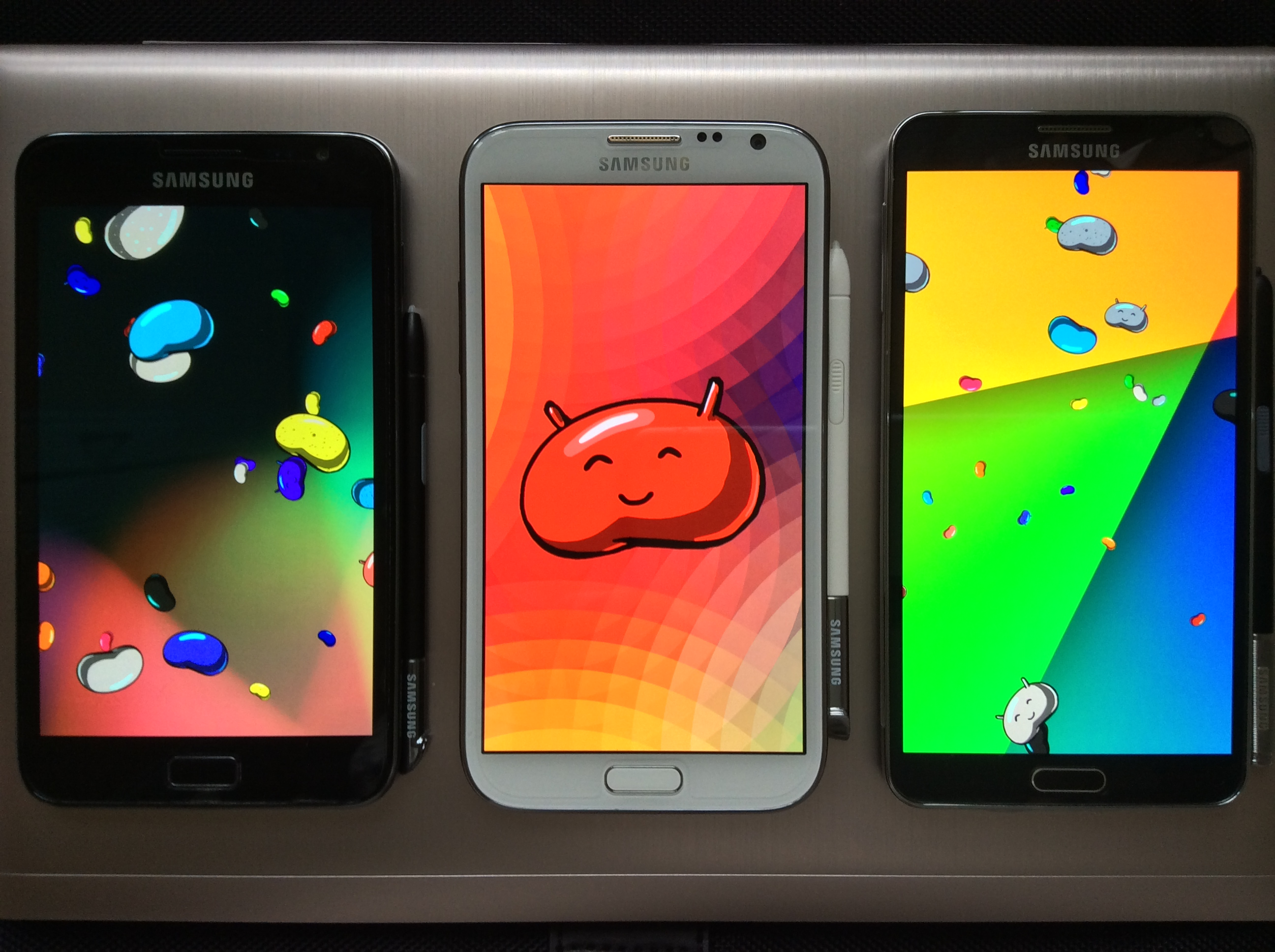
Android smartphones

Android, which runs the Linux kernel is the world's most popular mobile platform. As of September 2024, Android has 71.85% of the global mobile operating system market. Although based on the Linux kernel, Android has very little in common with the conventional desktop Linux software stack predominant in most Linux systems. This is mostly evident in Android not using GNU tools but instead Toybox as the userland. Android software run on a hypervisor inside a Java virtual machine, and therefore is incompatible with most other Linux-based systems.

==== Discontinued Linux-based mobile operating systems ====
Firefox OS was another open source Linux-based mobile operating system, which has now been discontinued.

Nokia previously produced some phones running a variant of Linux (e.g. the Nokia N900), but in 2013, Nokia's handset division was bought by Microsoft.

=== Other embedded systems with graphical user interface ===
Smartphones are gradually replacing these kinds of embedded devices, but they still exist. An example are the Portable media players. Some of the OEM firmware is Linux based. A community-driven fully free and open-source project is Rockbox.

In-vehicle infotainment hardware usually involves some kind of display, either built into the Dashboard or additional displays. The GENIVI Alliance, now called COVESA (Connected Vehicle Systems Alliance), works on a Linux-based open platform to run the IVI. It may have an interface to some values delivered by the Engine control unit but is albeit completely separate system. There will be a special variant of Tizen for IVI, different for the Tizen for smartphones in several regards.

== Hardware platforms without graphical user interface ==
=== Embedded systems without graphical user interface ===
Linux is often used in various single- or multi-purpose computer appliances and embedded systems.

Customer-premises equipment are a group of devices that are embedded and have no graphical user interface in the common sense. Some are remotely operated via Secure Shell or via some Web-based user interface running on some lightweight web server software. Most of the OEM firmware is based on the Linux kernel and other free and open-source software, e.g. Das U-Boot and BusyBox. There are also a couple of community driven projects, e.g. OpenWrt.

Smaller scale embedded network-attached storage-devices are also mostly Linux-driven.

=== Servers ===
Linux became popular in the Internet server market particularly due to the LAMP software bundle. In September 2008 Steve Ballmer (Microsoft CEO) claimed 60% of servers run Linux and 40% run Windows Server. According to IDC's report covering Q2 2013, Linux was up to 23.2% of worldwide server revenue although this does compensate for the potential price disparity between Linux and non-Linux servers. In May 2014, W3Techs estimated that 67.5% of the top 10 million (according to Alexa) websites run some form of Unix, and Linux is used by at least 57.2% of all those websites which use Unix.

==== Web servers ====
Linux-based solution stacks come with all the general advantages and benefits of free and open-source software. Some more commonly known examples are:

- LAMP
- MEAN stack

According to the Netcraft, as of 2019, nginx had the highest market share.

==== LDAP servers ====
There are various freely available implementations of LDAP servers.

==== Routers ====
Free routing software available for Linux includes BIRD, B.A.T.M.A.N., FRRouting, Quagga and XORP. Whether on Customer-premises equipment, on personal computer or server-hardware, the mainline Linux kernel or an adapted highly optimized Linux kernel is capable of doing routing at rates that are limited by the hardware bus throughput.

=== Supercomputers ===
Linux is the most popular operating system among supercomputers due to the general advantages and benefits of free and open-source software, like superior performance, flexibility, speed and lower costs. In November 2008 Linux held an 87.8 percent share of the world's top 500 supercomputers.

Since June 2018, every computer on the TOP500 list ran some version of Linux.

In January 2010, Weiwu Hu, chief architect of the Loongson family of CPUs at the Institute of Computing Technology, which is part of the Chinese Academy of Sciences, confirmed that the new Dawning 6000 supercomputer will use Chinese-made Loongson processors and will run Linux as its operating system. The most recent supercomputer the organization built, the Dawning 5000a, which was first run in 2008, used AMD chips and ran Windows HPC Server 2008.

== Advocacy ==
Many organizations advocate for Linux adoption. The foremost of these is the Linux Foundation which hosts and sponsors the key kernel developers, manages the Linux trademark, manages the Open Source Developer Travel Fund, provides legal aid to open source developers and companies through the Linux Legal Defense Fund, sponsors kernel.org and also hosts the Patent Commons Project.

The International Free and Open Source Software Foundation (iFOSSF) is a nonprofit organization based in Michigan, USA dedicated to accelerating and promoting the adoption of FOSS worldwide through research and civil society partnership networks.

The Open Invention Network was formed to protect vendors and customers from patent royalty fees while using OSS.

Other advocates for Linux include:

- IBM through its Linux Marketing Strategy
- Linux User Groups
- Asian Open Source Centre (AsiaOSC)
- The Brazilian government, under president Luiz Inácio Lula da Silva
- Software Livre Brasil, a Brazilian organization promoting Linux adoption in schools, public departments, commerce, industry and personal desktops.
- FOSS: Free and Open Source Software Foundations of India and China.

== History ==
Gartner claimed that Linux-powered personal computers accounted for 4% of unit sales in 2008. However, it is common for users to install Linux in addition to (as a dual boot arrangement) or in place of a factory-installed Microsoft Windows operating system.

=== Timeline ===
==== Before 2007 ====
- 1983 (September): GNU Project announced publicly
- 1991 (September): First version of the Linux kernel released to the Internet
- mid-1990s: Linux runs on cluster computers at NASA and elsewhere
- late 1990s: Dell, IBM and Hewlett-Packard offer commercial support for Linux on their hardware; Red Hat and VA Linux have initial public offerings
- 1999: EmperorLinux started shipping specially configured laptops running modified Linux distributions to ensure usability
- 2001 (second quarter): Linux server unit shipments recorded a 15% annual growth rate
- 2004: Linux shipped on approximately 50% of the worldwide server blade units, and 20% of all rack-optimized servers
- 2005: System76, a Linux-only computer OEM, starts selling Ubuntu pre-installed on laptops and desktops.

==== 2007 ====
- Dell announced it would ship select models with Ubuntu Linux pre-installed
- ZaReason is founded as a Linux only hardware OEM.
- Lenovo announced it would ship select models with SUSE Linux Enterprise Desktop pre-installed
- HP announced that it would begin shipping computers preinstalled with Red Hat Enterprise Linux in Australia
- ASUS launched the Linux-based ASUS Eee PC

==== 2008 ====
- Dell announced it would begin shipping Ubuntu-based computers to Canada and Latin America.
- Dell began shipping systems with Ubuntu pre-installed in China.
- Acer launched the Linux-based Acer Aspire One.
- In June 2008, the Electronics Corporation of Tamil Nadu (ELCOT), a bulk computer buyer for students in the Indian state of Tamil Nadu, decided to switch entirely to supplying Linux after Microsoft attempted to use its monopoly position to sell the organization Windows bundled with Microsoft Office. ELCOT declined the offer stating "Any such bundling could result in serious exploitation of the consumer."
- In August 2008, IBM cited market disillusionment with Windows Vista in announcing a new partnership arrangement with Red Hat, Novell and Canonical to offer "Microsoft-free" personal computers with IBM application software, including Lotus Notes and Lotus Symphony.

==== 2009 ====
- In January 2009, the New York Times stated: "More than 10 million people are estimated to run Ubuntu today".
- In mid-2009, Asus, as part of its It's better with Windows campaign, stopped offering Linux, for which they received strong criticism. The company claimed that competition from other netbook makers drove them to offer only Windows XP. Writing in May 2010 Computerworld columnist Steven J. Vaughan-Nichols said "I'm sure that the real reason is Microsoft has pressured Asus into abandoning Linux. On ASUS' site, you'll now see the slogan 'ASUS recommends Windows 7' proudly shown. Never mind that, while Windows 7 is a good operating system, Windows 7 is awful on netbooks."
- In May 2009, Fedora developer Jef Spaleta estimated on the basis of IP addresses of update downloads and statistics from the voluntary user hardware registration service Smolt that there are 16 million Fedora systems in use. No effort was made to estimate how much the Fedora installed base overlaps with other Linux distributions (enthusiasts installing many distributions on the same system).
- In June 2009, ZDNet reported "Worldwide, there are 13 million active Ubuntu users with use growing faster than any other distribution."

==== 2010 ====
- In April 2010, Chris Kenyon, vice president for OEM at Canonical Ltd., estimated that there were 12 million Ubuntu users.
- In June 2010, a Quebec Superior Court Judge Denis Jacques ruled that the provincial government broke the law when it spent Cdn$720,000, starting in the fall of 2006 to migrate 800 government workstations to Microsoft Windows Vista and Office 2007 without carrying out a "serious and documented search" for alternatives. The search for alternatives was legally required for any expenditures over Cdn$25,000. The court case was brought by Savoir Faire Linux, a small Montreal-based company that had hoped to bid Linux software to replace the government's aging Windows XP. The judge dismissed the government's contention that Microsoft software was chosen because employees were already familiar with Windows and that switching to a different operating system would have cost more.
- In October 2010, a statistics company stated that Android, Google's version of Linux for smartphones (and tablets), had become the most popular operating system among new buyers.

==== 2012 ====
- In November 2012, Top500.org's November 2012 list has all Top 10 Supercomputers as running a distribution of Linux as their Operating System.

==== 2013 ====
- In February 2013, Dice and the Linux Foundation released a survey that showed Linux skills in high demand among employers.
- Valve announces its Linux-based SteamOS for video game consoles.
- Supercomputers, Japan's bullet trains, traffic control, Toyota IVI, NYSE, CERN, FAA air traffic control, nuclear submarines and top websites all use Linux.
- In December 2013, the city of Munich announced that it successfully migrated 12,000 of its 15,000 computers to LiMux Linux and that the savings in 2013 alone were about 10 million euros.

==== 2014 ====
- In September 2014, the Italian city of Turin, the capital of Piedmont, decided to switch to Linux.
- In October 2014, the city of Gummersbach announced that their IT infrastructure now is based on 300 thin clients and 6 servers that run SuSe Linux.
- June 2014, France's National Gendarmerie has completed the migration of 65,000 to Linux "GendBuntu".
- In November 2014 Purism was founded as an OEM Linux manufacturer.

==== 2017 ====
- In November 2017, all 500 of the world's top supercomputers ran Linux.

==== 2018 ====
- In April 2018, Microsoft announced Azure Sphere, a Linux-based operating system for Internet of Things applications.
- In May 2018, pre-orders began for Atari VCS, a gaming console that is powered by the Linux kernel.

==== 2019 ====
- In May 2019, Microsoft announced Windows Subsystem for Linux 2, which will rely on a pre-installed Linux kernel built by Microsoft. This marks the first time that the Linux kernel has shipped with a Microsoft operating system.
- In May 2019, South Korea announced that it was looking to migrate its major government systems to Linux, due to the pending end of support for Windows 7.

==== 2020 ====
- In June 2020, Lenovo announced Linux certification for ThinkPad and ThinkStation portfolio products.

==== 2021 ====
- In January 2021, the government of the Argentinian province of Misiones announced that it had developed GobMis GNU/Linux, a distribution based on the Devuan operating system, specially designed for government offices.
- In February 2021 Linux was first used on Mars when NASA's Perseverance rover landed on 18 February.

==== 2022 ====
- In late February 2022, Steam Deck was released, which runs SteamOS 3.0, which is in turn based on Arch Linux.

==== 2024 ====
- In February 2024, Linux reached the 4% desktop market share for the first time. In July 2024, it hit an all-time high of 4.44%, growing from 2.76% in July 2022. In July 2024, its desktop market share in India was 16.21%.

==== 2025 ====
- In June 2025, Linux reached 5% of desktop market share in the United States, for the first time.
- In July 2025, Statcounter, a web traffic analysis company, within the operating system market share, showed that the Linux operating systems had, according to them, 3.9% of the worldwide market share.

==== 2026 ====
- In March 2026, Linux reached 5.3% share of Steam users, crossing the 5% threshold for the first time on the service.
- In April 2026, the French government announced that computers used by public institutions in the country would switch from using Windows to Linux by autumn 2026.
- In August 2026, the Chinese Ministry of State Security ordered some government entities to switch from using Windows 10 China Government edition to domestic Linux distributions.

== See also ==
- Diffusion (business)
- Disruptive innovation
- History of free and open-source software
- Comparison of open-source and closed-source software
- OpenDocument adoption
- Technology acceptance model
- Technology life cycle
- Timeline of free and open-source software
