= DeepComputing =

Technology company based in Hong Kong

DeepComputing, Ltd.
- Type: Private
- Industry: Computer hardware RISC-V
- Founded: 2022; 4 years ago
- Founder: Yuning Liang
- Headquarters: Sheung Wan, Hong Kong
- Products: Motherboards, Laptops
- Website: deepcomputing.io

DeepComputing is a technology company based in Hong Kong that develops and sells RISC-V based hardware. Its flagship products are laptops, tablets and PC motherboards with various processors based on the 64-bit RISC-V ISA.

== History ==
DeepComputing was founded in 2022, at Sheung Wan, Hong Kong by Yuning Liang. Yuning got the idea of founding a RISC-V hardware company while working at Xcalibyte, a compiler software company founded by him back in 2018. After configuring an old MIPS to compile for RISC-V ISA instead and realizing there was not much hardware available in the market based on it especially for personal use. According to him, people were not developing software for RISC-V due to a lack of hardware, and hardware companies were not using RISC-V based chips due to the lack of software and OS support. He says he wanted to break this "cycle" by opening the first RISC-V based PC hardware company, thus becoming "number one" in the field.

In May, launch of first RISC-V based laptop was rumored by Calista Redmond, former CEO of RISC-V International, with photos of prototypes being shipped to them. In July, DeepComputing together with Xcalibyte (a software company co-founded by Yuning) unveiled DC-ROMA, first commercially available laptop based on a RISC-V based microprocessor. A month later it was revealed that the SoC inside is an Alibaba TH1520. Later on the SoC was changed to the StarFive JH7110. It got released with OpenKylin or Debian Linux pre-installed.

In June 2024, DeepComputing released another laptop named DC-ROMA II, claiming it to be the first RISC-V based laptop to run Ubuntu without any configuration. It was based on SpacemiT K1 SoC, an 8-core CPU running up to 2.0 GHz, and together with NPU, 2 TOPS of AI capability. In August, the company announced the first ever RISC-V based tablet named DC ROMA PAD II, which was powered by the same K1 SoC. It was priced around $149.

In November 2024, DeepComputing announced the DC-ROMA Mainboard for the Framework Laptop 13, a highly modifiable laptop. The partnership was announced back in June by both companies. The motherboard includes a StarFive JH7110 SoC, and was made available for $199.

In March 2025, DeepComputing announced the DC-ROMA AI PC motherboard (initially called Mainboard II), for the Framework Laptop 13 again. It is based on ESWIN's EIC7702X SoC, that has AI capabilities up to 50 TOPS when the NPU (Neural Processing Unit) is enabled. Preorders started from $300, for orders to be effective by July of the same year.

== Products ==
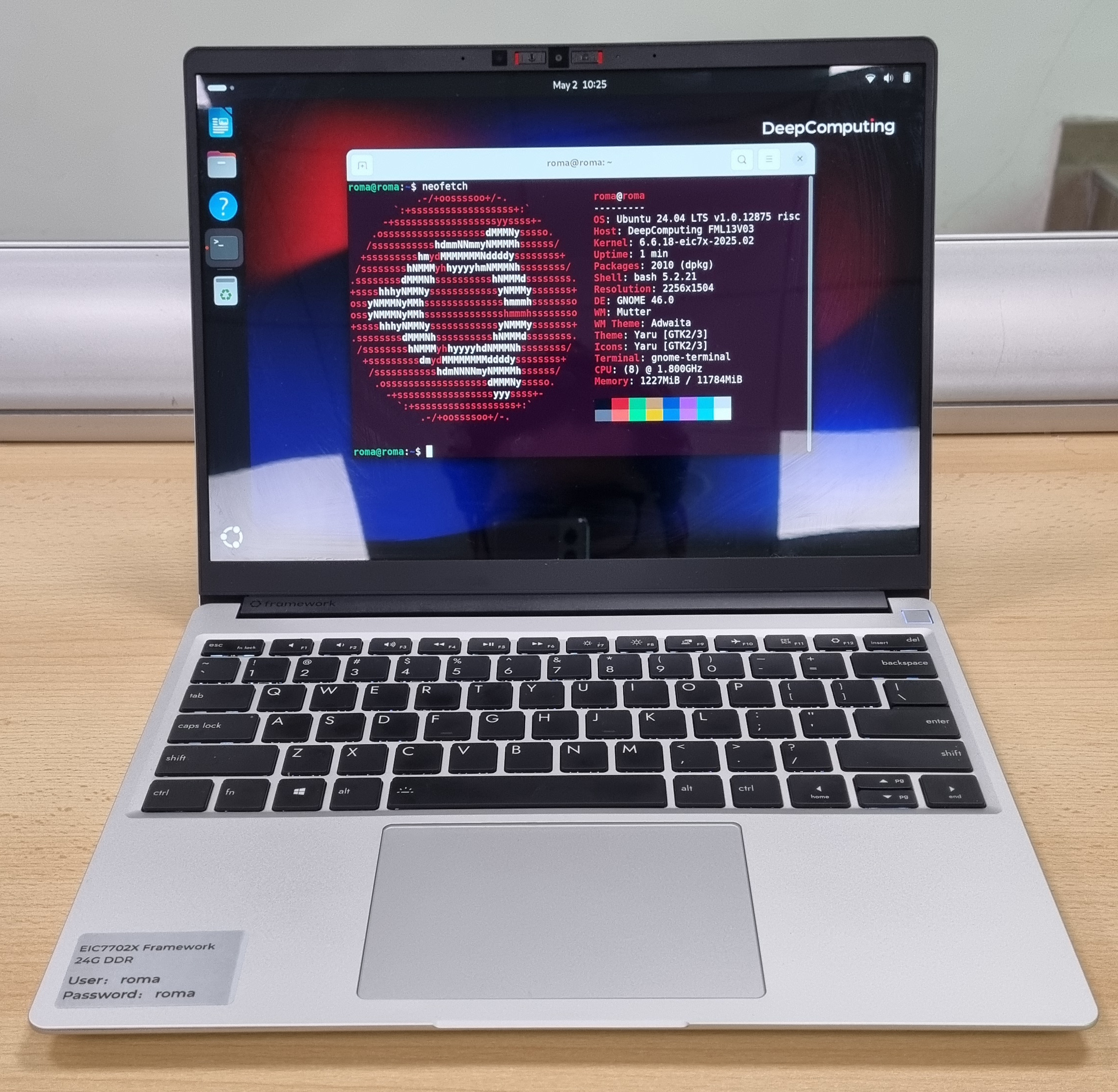
Framework Laptop 13, with DC-ROMA RISC-V AI PC motherboard, running Ubuntu 24.04, and showing neofetch output

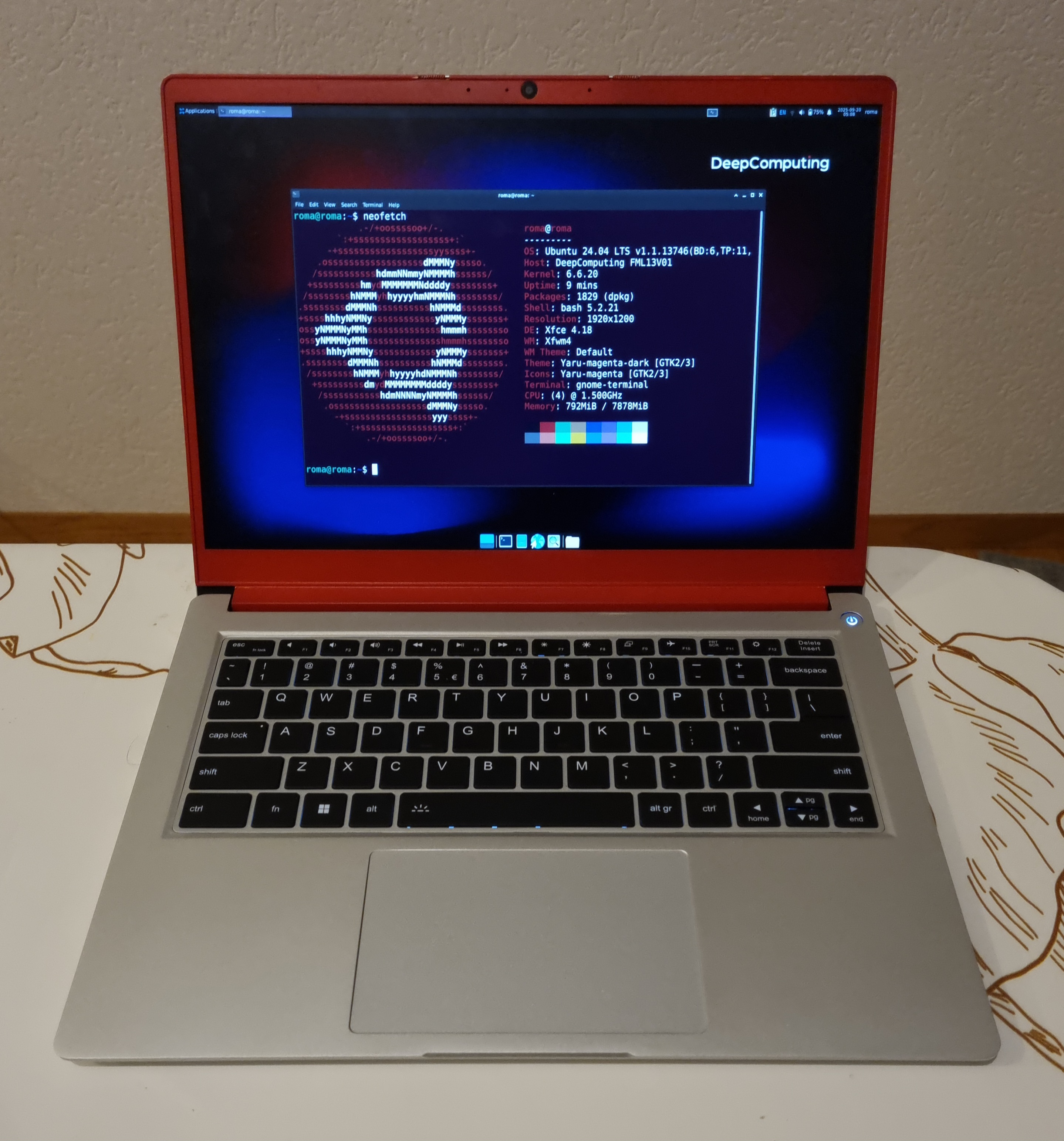
Never released 14-inch Framework Laptop prototype containing a DC-ROMA RISC-V mainboard with StarFive SoC

DeepComputing develops hardware ranging from laptops and mainboards, to AI PCs and embedded accessories. DeepComputing products only use chips based around the RISC-V open standard ISA, which is the main selling point and principle of the company.

=== DC-ROMA ===
- DC-ROMA, the first product of the company and world's first commercially available RISC-V laptop. It uses a quad-core StarFive JH7110 SoC. It has up to 8 GB RAM, 1 TB SSD, a 1080p monocular camera, 2 USB 3.0 ports and a Type-C power adapter. It supports openKylin, Debian and several other Linux distributions.
- DC-ROMA II, the second laptop of the company. With an octo-core SpacemiT K1 SoC. It has up to 16GB RAM, 1TB SSD, a 1080P monocular camera, 2 USB 3.0 and Type-C ports, 1 MicroSD port and a Type-C power adapter. It also has GPIO, allowing access to I²C and other types of direct access to the SoC. It comes with Ubuntu or Fedora pre-installed, and supports other Linux distributions.
- DC-ROMA Pad II, tablet version of DC-ROMA II based on the same K1 SoC.
- DC-ROMA Mainboard, the first Framework compatible motherboard by the company. With a quad-core JH7110 SoC, just like first RISC-V laptop.
- DC-ROMA AI PC, the second Framework motherboard by the company, and marketed as a local AI-capable PC. With an octo-core ESWIN EIC7702X SoC. CPU cores are P550 designed by SiFive. The SoC contains an NPU that provides AI capability up to 50 TOPS.

=== Other ===
- StationV D300, a workstation based on a RISC-V processor with 64 cores and AI accelerator card support.
- DC-ROMEO, an RC car series based on the ESP32-C6.
- Debug Expansion Card, a Framework compatible expansion card providing UART/EC-S/USB-C to DC-ROMA mainboards.
