= Carry-less product =

Result of carry-less multiplication

Computing the carry-less product.

The carry-less product of two binary numbers is the result of carry-less multiplication of these numbers. This operation conceptually works like long multiplication except for the fact that the carry is discarded instead of applied to the more significant position. It can be used to model operations over finite fields, in particular multiplication of polynomials from GF(2)[X], the polynomial ring over GF(2).

The operation is also known as an XOR multiplication, as carry-discarding addition is equivalent to an exclusive or.

== Definition ==
Given two numbers $\textstyle a=\sum_i a_i2^i$ and $\textstyle b=\sum_i b_i2^i$, with $a_i,b_i\in\{0,1\}$ denoting the bits of these numbers, the carry-less product of these two numbers is defined to be $\textstyle c=\sum_i c_i2^i$, with each bit $c_i$ computed as the exclusive or of products of bits from the input numbers as follows:

$$c_i=\bigoplus_{j=0}^i a_jb_{i-j}$$

== Example ==
Consider a = 10100010_{2} and b = 10010110_{2}, with all numbers given in binary. Then the carry-less multiplication of these is essentially what one would get from performing a long multiplication but ignoring the carries.

                  1 0 1 0 0 0 1 0 = a
   ---------------|---|-------|--
   1 0 0 1 0 1 1 0|0 0 0 0 0 0 0
       1 0 0 1 0 1 1 0|0 0 0 0 0
               1 0 0 1 0 1 1 0|0
   ------------------------------
   1 0 1 1 0 0 0 1 1 1 0 1 1 0 0
             ^ ^

For every logic 1 bit in the number a, the number b is shifted to the left as many bits as indicated by the position these bits a. All these shifted versions are then "added" by using an XOR instead of the regular binary addition used in regular long multiplication. Results of XOR are indicated by ^ . In full binary adder these would result in a carry to the column to the left. Here this does not happen so the carry-less product of a and b would be c = 101100011101100_{2}.

== Multiplication of polynomials ==
The carry-less product can also be seen as a multiplication of polynomials over the field GF(2). This is because the exclusive or corresponds to the addition in this field.

In the example above, the numbers a and b correspond to polynomials

$$A=\sum_i a_i X^i=X^7+X^5+X^1\qquad B=\sum_i b_i X^i=X^7+X^4+X^2+X^1$$

and the product of these is

$$C=A\cdot B=\sum_i c_i X^i=X^{14}+X^{12}+X^{11}+X^7+X^6+X^5+X^3+X^2$$

which is what the number c computed above encodes. Notice how $(X^7\cdot X^1)+(X^1\cdot X^7)\equiv0$ and $(X^7\cdot X^2)+(X^5\cdot X^4)\equiv0$ thanks to the arithmetic in GF(2). This corresponds to the columns marked ^ in the example.

== Applications ==
The elements of GF(2^{n}), i.e. a finite field whose order is a power of two, are usually represented as polynomials in GF(2)[X]. Multiplication of two such field elements consists of multiplication of the corresponding polynomials, followed by a reduction with respect to some irreducible polynomial which is taken from the construction of the field. If the polynomials are encoded as binary numbers, carry-less multiplication can be used to perform the first step of this computation.

Such fields have applications in cryptography and for some checksum algorithms.

== Implementations ==
Many modern CPU architectures support various extensions that provide hardware support for some form of carry-less multiplication. This support may take the form of either vector or scalar instructions.

Listed below are some instruction set extensions for carry-less multiplication in various CPU architectures.

CPU architecture	Instruction set extension	Instruction mnemonic	Multiplication size	Implementations
Intel x86	PCLMULQDQ (scalar)	PCLMULQDQ	64x64→128	Intel Core/Xeon (Westmere and later), Intel Atom (Goldmont and later), AMD Bulldozer/Jaguar/Zen, Zhaoxin ZX-C and later
Intel x86	VPCLMULQDQ (vector)	VPCLMULQDQ	64x64→128 (vector)	Intel Core/Xeon (Ice Lake/Rocket Lake and later), AMD Zen 3 and later
ARM (32-bit)	NEON	VMUL.P8	8x8→8 (vector, low half)	ARM Cortex-A8 and later
ARM (32-bit)	NEON	VMULL.P8	8x8→16 (vector)	ARM Cortex-A8 and later
ARM (32-bit)	ARMv8 Cryptographic; Extensions	VMULL.P64	64x64→128	ARM Cortex-A57 and later, Apple Cyclone and later
ARM (64-bit)	NEON	PMUL	8x8→8 (vector, low half)	ARM Cortex-A57 and later, Apple Cyclone and later
ARM (64-bit)	NEON	PMULL, PMULL2	8x8→16 (vector)	ARM Cortex-A57 and later, Apple Cyclone and later
ARM (64-bit)	ARMv8 Cryptographic; Extensions	PMULL, PMULL2	64x64→128	ARM Cortex-A57 and later, Apple Cyclone and later
ARM (64-bit)	SVE2	PMULLB, PMULLT	8x8→16 (vector), 32x32→64 (vector)	Many, e.g.: Qualcomm Snapdragon 8 Elite gen 5 and later; Mediatek Dimensity 9000 and later; Samsung Exynos 2200 and later; Alibaba Yitian 710
ARM (64-bit)	SVE_PMULL	PMULLB, PMULLT	64x64→128 (vector)	Many, e.g.: Qualcomm Snapdragon 8 Elite gen 5 and later; Mediatek Dimensity 9000 and later; Samsung Exynos 2200 and later; Alibaba Yitian 710
ARM (64-bit)	SVE_AES2	PMLAL	64x64→128 (vector, two sets of multiply-XOR)	Many, e.g.: Qualcomm Snapdragon 8 Elite gen 5 and later; Mediatek Dimensity 9000 and later; Samsung Exynos 2200 and later; Alibaba Yitian 710
Power ISA	Power ISA v2.07	VPMSUMB	8x8→16 (vector)	IBM POWER8 and later
Power ISA	Power ISA v2.07	VPMSUMH	16x16→32 (vector)	IBM POWER8 and later
Power ISA	Power ISA v2.07	VPMSUMW	32x32→64 (vector)	IBM POWER8 and later
Power ISA	Power ISA v2.07	VPMSUMD	64x64→128	IBM POWER8 and later
RISC-V	Zbc (scalar bit-manipulation)	CLMUL, CLMULH, CLMULR	XLENxXLEN→XLEN (32x32 in 32-bit mode, 64x64 in 64-bit mode, each instruction returns half of the result)	Many, e.g.: Alibaba XuanTie C908; OpenHW Group CVA6; Andes Technology AndesCore A25; AMD MicroBlaze V
RISC-V	Zvbc (vector bit-manipulation)	VCLMUL, VCLMULH	64x64→64 (vector; low or high half)	SpacemiT K3
SPARC	VIS 3	XMULX, XMULXHI	64x64→64 (low or high half)	SPARC T4 and later
z/Architecture	Vector Facility	VGFM, VGFMA	8x8→16 (vector), 16x16→32 (vector), 32x32→64 (vector), 64x64→128	IBM z13 and later

For other targets it is possible to implement the computation above as a software algorithm, and many cryptography libraries will contain an implementation as part of their finite field arithmetic operations.

For wide carry-less multiplications, it is possible to adapt fast integer multiplication algorithms such as the Karatsuba and Toom-Cook algorithms to work with carry-less multiplications.

== Other bases ==
The definition of a carry-less product as the result of a long multiplication discarding carry would readily apply to bases other than 2. But the result depends on the basis, which is therefore an essential part of the operation. As this operation is typically being used on computers operating in binary, the binary form discussed above is the one employed in practice.

Polynomials over other finite fields of prime order do have applications, but treating the coefficients of such a polynomial as the digits of a single number is rather uncommon, so the multiplication of such polynomials would not be seen as a carry-less multiplication of numbers.

== See also ==
- CLMUL instruction set, an x86 ISA extension
- Finite field arithmetic
- Galois/Counter Mode
