= Calista Redmond =

Calista Redmond is an American executive who was CEO of The RISC-V Foundation. Redmond joined the RISC-V Foundation in March 2019. Prior to her appointment, she spent 12 years at IBM and was vice president of the IBM Z ecosystem from 2016 to 2019. As part of her work at IBM, Redmond was a director at OpenPOWER and was also involved with OpenDaylight and Open Mainframe Project. Redmond received her MBA from the University of Michigan's Ross School of Business in 2006 and her BS from Northwestern University in 1996.

Calista Redmond is currently the vice president of global AI initiatives at NVIDIA

== RISC-V leadership ==
Redmond has actively led new initiatives for RISC-V since 2019, including developer conferences, partnerships with major tech companies and chip designers, and open source educational outreach. Among these initiatives is Redmond's work to create the RISC-V partnership with the European Processor Initiative, involving chip research groups across the continent. Redmond hosted RISC-V's annual summit in December 2020, partnering with Western Digital, Seagate Technology, Huawei, and ZTE. Redmond has marketed RISC-V as an ARM alternative both previous to and following ARM's proposed acquisition by Nvidia. Redmond also moved the RISC-V Foundation's headquarters from Delaware to Switzerland in 2019 in an effort to promote the economic and political neutrality of the architecture after US politicians raised concerns about the use of RISC-V by Chinese tech companies.
