= Andes Technology =

Taiwanese semiconductor company

Andes Technology Corporation
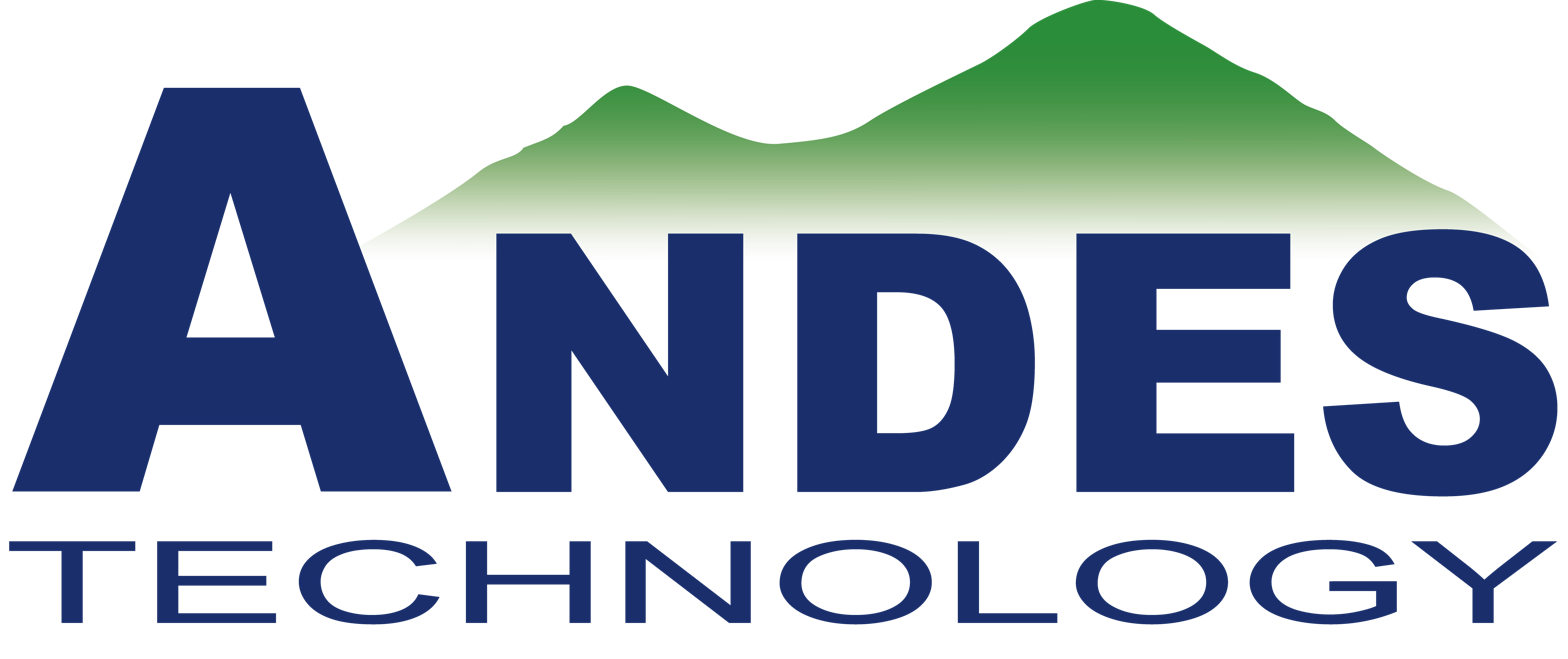
- Type: Public limited
- Traded as: TWSE: 6533
- Industry: Semiconductor
- Founded: (2005; 21 years ago)
- Headquarters: Hsinchu Science and Industrial Park, Hsinchu, Taiwan
- Area served: Worldwide
- Key people: Tsai Ming-kai (Chairman)
- Website: www.andestech.com

Andes Technology Corporation is a Taiwanese supplier of 32/64-bit embedded CPU cores and a founding Premier member of RISC-V International. It focuses on the embedded market and delivers CPU cores with integrated development environment and associated software and hardware for SoC development. With regard to the computing-processors market, Andes is ranked the fifth largest intellectual-property company in the world. By the end of 2022, the cumulative volume of Andes-Embedded SoCs had surpassed 12 billion.

== History ==
Andes was founded in Hsinchu Science Park, Taiwan in 2005 and went public on the Taiwan Stock Exchange and began trading on 14 March 2017.

In 2016, Andes joined RISC-V International Association and became the founding Premier member in 2020. In 2017, Andes expanded its product lines by adding RISC-V processors based on AndeStar V5 architecture.

== Applications ==
Andes CPU cores are applied to applications including 5G, ADAS, AI/machine learning, AR/VR, audio, blockchain, Bluetooth, cloud computing, data centers, gaming, GPS, IoT, MCU, security, sensing, sensor fusion, SSD controllers, storage, touch screen and TDDI controllers, USB 3.0 storage, voice recognition, Wi-Fi, wireless charger and so on.

== Partners ==
Andes has more than 150 partners, including foundry (such as TSMC, UMC, GlobalFoundries), Electronic Design Automation (EDA), IP, design service (such as Faraday and GUC), key component, development tool, medium & application software, operating software, academic & education, industry & affiliations members.
