= Zero register =

CPU register that is always zero

A zero register is a processor register that always returns the value zero and has no effect when it is written to. It is found in instruction set architectures including the CDC 6600, MIPS, SPARC, Alpha, ARM64, and RISC-V, among others.

Zero appears as a constant in many instructions, notably "branch if zero", and optimizing these instructions can have a positive benefit on performance. Some architectures accomplish this with dedicated opcodes, specialized variations of their basic instructions. Implementing these requires additional logic in the instruction decoder. The zero register can accomplish the same effect without requiring new opcodes, although at the cost of dedicating a register to this feature, which may have negative impact for architectures with limited number of registers. The rationale given for including it in RISC-V is that "Dedicating a register to zero is surprisingly a large factor in simplifying the RISC-V ISA."

The x86 architecture has no zero register, while ARM added a zero register for ARM64.

Some instruction set architectures, such as System/360 through z/Architecture and POWER/PowerPC/Power ISA have registers that are not always zero, but that are zero when the register is used as an index register.
