= SpacemiT =

Computing chip company based in Hangzhou, China

SpacemiT Hangzhou Technology, Co.
- Type: Private
- Industry: RISC-V Microprocessors
- Founded: 2021; 5 years ago
- Headquarters: Hangzhou, China
- Products: CPU design, System on a chip
- Website: spacemit.com

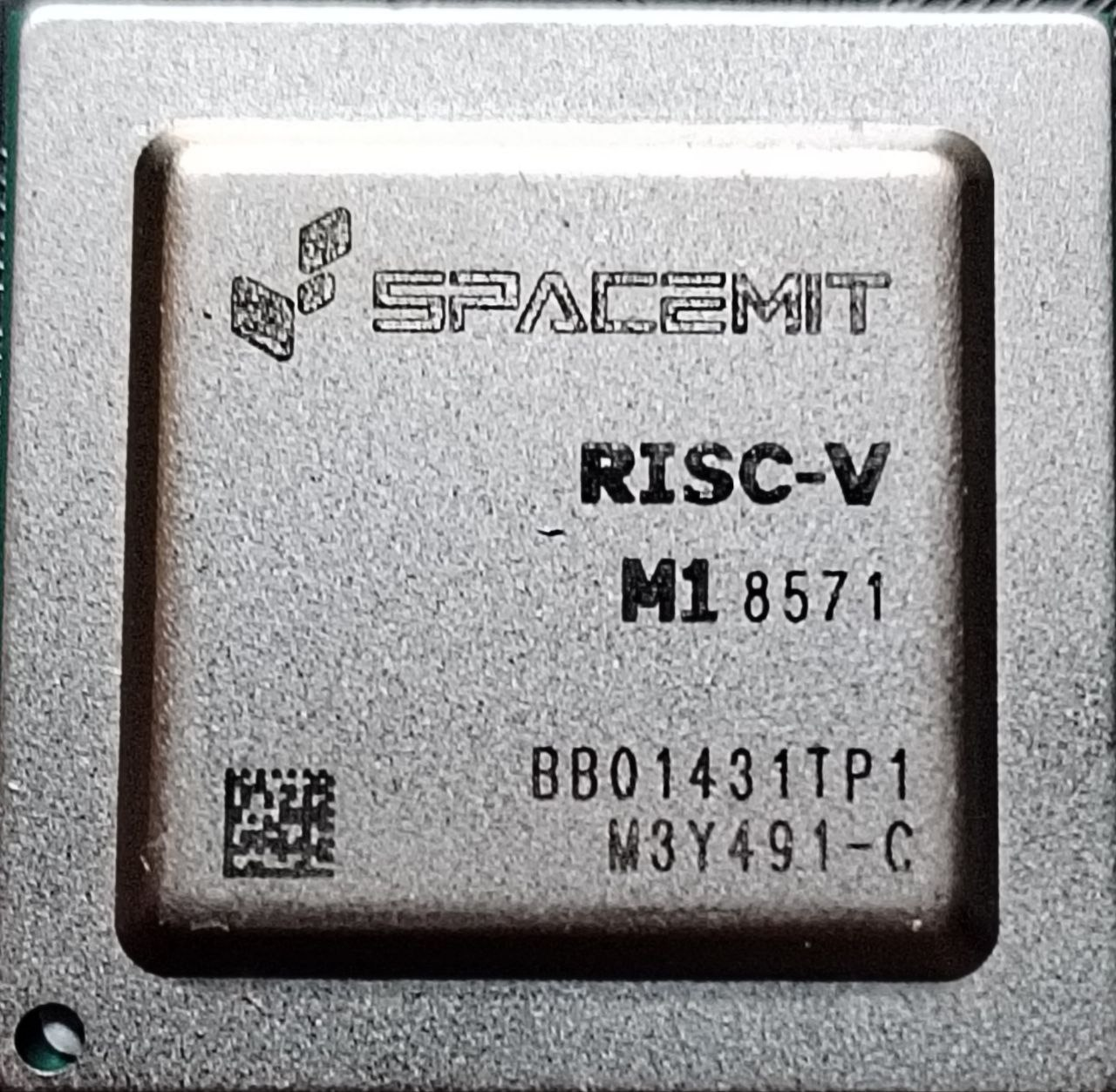
SpacemiT M1 RISC-V system on a chip (SoC)

SpacemiT (Chinese: 进迭时空) is a computing-chip company based in Hangzhou, China, founded in 2021, which is focused on computer processors based on the architecture RISC-V to be used mainly in the area of artificial intelligence (AI CPUs).

The name SpacemiT is a play on the word ‘spacetime’, with the word time reversed to mirror off the ‘e’.

In 2024, the company unveiled the Muse Book laptop with the Bianbu OS operating system, based on its Key Stone K1 octa-core RISC-V chip. In January 2025, it announced the development of a server processor with up to 64 RISC-V cores, named "VitalStone V100", made on a 12nm-class process technology. The VitalStone V100 supports virtualization, memory virtualization through an IOMMU which complies with the RISC-V architecture and the AXI4-Stream DTI interface.

In July 2025, during the RISC-V Summit, the company announced a new system on chip (SoC), called SpacemiT K3, that will be based on the RVA23-profile-compliant X100 core. This core can be assembled in clusters of up to 64 cores. The new SoC was made available for end-users during the first half of 2026.

== Muse ==
Under their trademark Muse, SpacemiT also sells various electronic products, including clocks, audio devices, turntables, DVD players, and home appliance.
