= Kylin (operating system) =

Chinese computer operating system

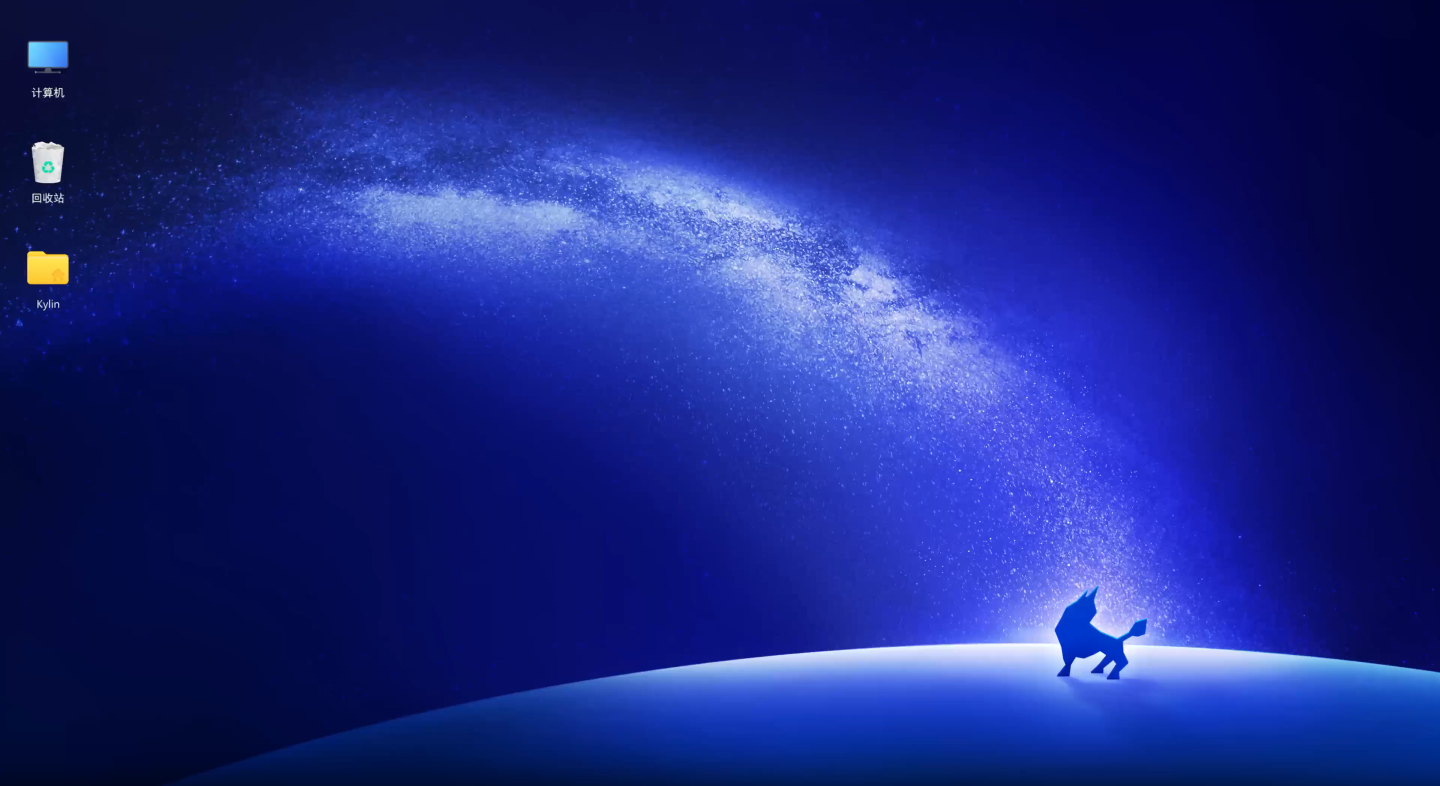
- Kylin Linux V11
- Developer: National University of Defense Technology, Kylin Software, China Electronics Corp's
- OS family: Linux (Unix-like)
- Initial release: 2001; 25 years ago
- Latest release: 11.0
- Available in: Chinese, Arabic, English, French, Spanish, and 52 others
- Supported platforms: x86-64, ARM
- Kernel type: Monolithic
- Default user interface: UKUI (based on Qt)
- License: Proprietary
- Official website: www.kylinos.cn (archive)

Kylin (Chinese: 麒麟; pinyin: Qílín; Wade–Giles: Ch'i²-lin²) is an operating system developed by academics at the National University of Defense Technology in the People's Republic of China since 2001. It is named after the mythical beast qilin. The first versions were based on FreeBSD and were intended for use by the Chinese military and other government organizations. With version 3.0, Kylin became Linux-based, and there is a version called NeoKylin which was announced in 2010.

By 2019, the NeoKylin variant was compatible with more than 4,000 software and hardware products, and it ships pre-installed on most computers sold in China. Together, Kylin and NeoKylin have 90% market share of the government sector.

A separate project using Ubuntu as the base Linux operating system was announced in 2013. The first version of Ubuntu Kylin was released in April 2013.

In August 2020, v10 of Kylin OS was launched. It is compatible with 10,000 hardware and software products, and it "supports Google's Android ecosystem".

In July 2022, an open-source version of Kylin titled openKylin was released.

== FreeBSD version ==
Development of Kylin began in 2001, when the National University of Defense Technology was assigned the mission of developing an operating system under the 863 Program intended to make China independent of foreign technology. The aim was "to support several kinds of server platforms, to achieve high performance, high availability and high security, as well as conforming to international standards of Unix and Linux operating systems". It was created using a hierarchy model, including "the basic kernel layer which is similar to Mach, the system service layer which is similar to BSD and the desktop environment which is similar to Windows". It was designed to comply with the UNIX standards and to be compatible with Linux applications.

In February 2006, "China Military Online" (a website sponsored by PLA Daily of the Chinese People's Liberation Army) reported the "successful development of the Kylin server operating system", which it said was "the first 64-bit operating system with high security level (B2 class)" and "also the first operating system without Linux kernel that has obtained Linux global standard authentification [sic] by the international Free Standards Group".

In April 2006, it was said that the Kylin operating system was largely based on FreeBSD 5.3. An anonymous Chinese student in Australia, who used the pseudonym "Dancefire", carried out a kernel similarity analysis and showed that the similarities between the two operating systems reached 99.45 percent. One of Kylin's developers confirmed that Kylin was based on FreeBSD during a speech at the international conference EuroBSDCon 2006.

In 2009, a report presented to the U.S.–China Economic and Security Review Commission stated that the purpose of Kylin is to make Chinese computers impenetrable to competing countries in the cyberwarfare arena. The Washington Times reported that:

China has developed more secure operating software for its tens of millions of computers and is already installing it on government and military systems, hoping to make Beijing's networks impenetrable to U.S. military and intelligence agencies.

The deployment of Kylin was said to have "hardened key Chinese servers".

== Kylin Linux (NeoKylin) ==
With the advent of version 3.0, Kylin has used the Linux kernel.

In December 2010, it was announced that China Standard Software and the National University of Defense Technology had signed a strategic partnership to launch a version called NeoKylin. China Standard Software is the maker of the "NeoShine Linux" desktop series. NeoKylin is intended for use by government offices, national defense, energy and other sectors of the Chinese economy.

In 2014, Bloomberg News reported that the northeastern city of Siping had migrated its computers from Microsoft Windows to NeoKylin, as part of a government effort to shift computer technology to Chinese suppliers. In September 2015, US computer maker Dell reported that 42% of personal computers they sold in China were now running NeoKylin.

The operating system of the Tianhe-1 supercomputer is 64-bit Kylin Linux, which is oriented to high-performance parallel computing optimization, and supports power management and high-performance virtual computing. The newer Tianhe-2 also uses Kylin Linux.

== Ubuntu Kylin ==
In 2013, Canonical reached an agreement with the Ministry of Industry and Information Technology of the People's Republic of China to release an Ubuntu-based Linux OS with features targeted at the Chinese market. Ubuntu Kylin has been described as "a loose continuation of China's Kylin OS". It is intended for desktop and laptop computers. The first official release, Ubuntu Kylin 13.04, was on 25 April 2013.

== See also ==
- Astra Linux – a similar project by the Russian government
- Unity Operating System
- Canaima (operating system) – a similar project by the Venezuelan computer manufacturer VIT, C.A. and Chinese information technology company Inspur
- GendBuntu – a similar project used by Gendarmerie in France
- LiMux – a similar project of the city council of Munich
- Nova (operating system) – a similar project by the Cuban government
- Red Star OS – a similar project by the North Korean government
