= Migration =

Migration, migratory, or migrate may refer to:

== Human migration ==
- Human migration, physical movement by humans from one region to another
  - International migration, when peoples cross state boundaries and stay in the host state for some minimum length of time

== Natural sciences ==
=== Biology ===
- Migration (ecology), the large-scale movement of species from one environment to another
  - Animal migration
  - Bird migration
- Plant migration, see Seed dispersal, the movement or transport of seeds away from the parent plant
  - Forest migration
- Gene migration, a process in evolution and population genetics
- Cell migration, a process in the development and maintenance of multicellular organisms
  - Collective cell migration, describing the movements of group of cells

=== Physics and chemistry ===
- Molecular diffusion, in physics
- Migration (chemistry), type of reaction in organic chemistry
- Seismic migration, in seismic and ground penetrating radar data processing
- Microscopic motion of material caused by an external force, distinct from spontaneous diffusion, including drift current, electrophoresis, electromigration, thermodiffusion, sedimentation, in physical chemistry and materials
- Planetary migration, the alteration of the satellite's orbital parameters

== Information technology ==
- Migration (virtualization), the process by which a running virtual machine is moved from one physical host to another
- Content migration, the process of moving information to a new system
- Data migration, the process of transferring data between storage types, formats, or computer systems
- PC migration, the process of transferring the entire user environment between two computer systems
- Schema migration, the management of incremental, reversible changes to relational database schemas
- Software migration, the conversion, rewriting or porting of a legacy system to a modern computer system
- System migration, the tasks involved when moving data and applications from current hardware to new hardware

== Arts and media ==
=== Music ===
- "Migrate" (song), a 2008 song from Mariah Carey's album E=MC²
- Migration (The Amboy Dukes album)
- Migration (Antonio Sánchez album), a 2007 album by Antonio Sánchez
- Migration (Bonobo album), 2017 album by Bonobo
- Migration (Creative Source album), the second album by Los Angeles, California-based R&B group Creative Source
- Migration (Dave Grusin album)
- The Migration, album by Scale the Summit
- Migrations (album), a 2006 album by The Duhks

=== Other media ===
- Migrations, a 2000 photo essay and book by Sebastião Salgado
- Migrations, 1929 novel by Miloš Crnjanski
- Migrations (film), a 1988 Yugoslav film based on the novel
- Migrations, by Karim Alrawi, a stage play and winner of the John Whiting Award
- Migration (2014 film), an animated film by Mark Lomond and Johanne Ste-Marie
- Migration (2023 film), an animated film

== Other uses ==
- Piercing migration, in body modification, a process that occurs when a body piercing moves from its initial location

== See also ==
- Immigration
- Emigration
- Migrant (disambiguation)
- Great Migration (disambiguation)
- Migration period, a period in European history that saw the fall of the Western Roman Empire and large-scale migrations
