= Knowledge extraction =

Creation of knowledge from structured and unstructured sources

Knowledge extraction is the creation of knowledge from structured (relational databases, XML) and unstructured (text, documents, images) sources. The resulting knowledge needs to be in a machine-readable and machine-interpretable format and must represent knowledge in a manner that facilitates inferencing. Although it is methodically similar to information extraction (IE) in natural language processing (NLP) and extract, transform, load (ETL), the main criterion is that the extraction result goes beyond the creation of structured information or the transformation into a relational schema. It requires either the reuse of existing formal knowledge (reusing identifiers or ontologies) or the generation of a schema based on the source data.

The RDB2RDF W3C group was standardizing a language for extraction of resource description frameworks (RDF) from relational databases. Another popular example for knowledge extraction is the transformation of Wikipedia into structured data and also the mapping to existing knowledge (see DBpedia and Freebase).

== Overview ==
After the standardization of knowledge representation languages such as RDF and OWL, much research has been conducted in the area, especially regarding transforming relational databases into RDF, identity resolution, knowledge discovery and ontology learning. The general process uses traditional methods from information extraction and extract, transform, and load (ETL), which transform the data from the sources into structured formats. So understanding how the interact and learn from each other.

The following criteria can be used to categorize approaches in this topic (some of them only account for extraction from relational databases):

Source	Which data sources are covered: Text, Relational Databases, XML, CSV
Exposition	How is the extracted knowledge made explicit (ontology file, semantic database)? How can you query it?
Synchronization	Is the knowledge extraction process executed once to produce a dump or is the result synchronized with the source? Static or dynamic. Are changes to the result written back (bi-directional)
Reuse of vocabularies	The tool is able to reuse existing vocabularies in the extraction. For example, the table column 'firstName' can be mapped to foaf:firstName. Some automatic approaches are not capable of mapping vocab.
Automatization	The degree to which the extraction is assisted/automated. Manual, GUI, semi-automatic, automatic.
Requires a domain ontology	A pre-existing ontology is needed to map to it. So either a mapping is created or a schema is learned from the source (ontology learning).

== Examples ==
=== Entity linking ===
1. DBpedia Spotlight, OpenCalais, Dandelion dataTXT, the Zemanta API, Extractiv and PoolParty Extractor analyze free text via named-entity recognition and then disambiguates candidates via name resolution and links the found entities to the DBpedia knowledge repository (Dandelion dataTXT demo or DBpedia Spotlight web demo or PoolParty Extractor Demo).

President Obama called Wednesday on Congress to extend a tax break for students included in last year's economic stimulus package, arguing that the policy provides more generous assistance.

As President Obama is linked to a DBpedia LinkedData resource, further information can be retrieved automatically and a Semantic Reasoner can for example infer that the mentioned entity is of the type Person (using FOAF (software)) and of type Presidents of the United States (using YAGO). Counter examples: Methods that only recognize entities or link to Wikipedia articles and other targets that do not provide further retrieval of structured data and formal knowledge.

=== Relational databases to RDF ===
1. Triplify, D2R Server, Ultrawrap, and Virtuoso RDF Views are tools that transform relational databases to RDF. During this process they allow reusing existing vocabularies and ontologies during the conversion process. When transforming a typical relational table named users, one column (e.g.name) or an aggregation of columns (e.g.first_name and last_name) has to provide the URI of the created entity. Normally the primary key is used. Every other column can be extracted as a relation with this entity. Then properties with formally defined semantics are used (and reused) to interpret the information. For example, a column in a user table called marriedTo can be defined as symmetrical relation and a column homepage can be converted to a property from the FOAF Vocabulary called foaf:homepage, thus qualifying it as an inverse functional property. Then each entry of the user table can be made an instance of the class foaf:Person (Ontology Population). Additionally domain knowledge (in form of an ontology) could be created from the status_id, either by manually created rules (if status_id is 2, the entry belongs to class Teacher ) or by (semi)-automated methods (ontology learning). Here is an example transformation:

Name	marriedTo	homepage	status_id
Peter	Mary	https://example.org/Peters_page	1
Claus	Eva	https://example.org/Claus_page	2

:Peter :marriedTo :Mary .  
:marriedTo a owl:SymmetricProperty .  
:Peter foaf:homepage  <https://example.org/Peters_page> .  
:Peter a foaf:Person .   
:Peter a :Student .  
:Claus a :Teacher .

== Extraction from structured sources to RDF ==
=== 1:1 Mapping from RDB Tables/Views to RDF Entities/Attributes/Values ===
When building a RDB representation of a problem domain, the starting point is frequently an entity-relationship diagram (ERD). Typically, each entity is represented as a database table, each attribute of the entity becomes a column in that table, and relationships between entities are indicated by foreign keys. Each table typically defines a particular class of entity, each column one of its attributes. Each row in the table describes an entity instance, uniquely identified by a primary key. The table rows collectively describe an entity set. In an equivalent RDF representation of the same entity set:

- Each column in the table is an attribute (i.e., predicate)
- Each column value is an attribute value (i.e., object)
- Each row key represents an entity ID (i.e., subject)
- Each row represents an entity instance
- Each row (entity instance) is represented in RDF by a collection of triples with a common subject (entity ID).

So, to render an equivalent view based on RDF semantics, the basic mapping algorithm would be as follows:

1. create an RDFS class for each table
2. convert all primary keys and foreign keys into IRIs
3. assign a predicate IRI to each column
4. assign an rdf:type predicate for each row, linking it to an RDFS class IRI corresponding to the table
5. for each column that is neither part of a primary or foreign key, construct a triple containing the primary key IRI as the subject, the column IRI as the predicate and the column's value as the object.

Early mentioning of this basic or direct mapping can be found in Tim Berners-Lee's comparison of the ER model to the RDF model.

=== Complex mappings of relational databases to RDF ===
The 1:1 mapping mentioned above exposes the legacy data as RDF in a straightforward way, additional refinements can be employed to improve the usefulness of RDF output respective the given Use Cases. Normally, information is lost during the transformation of an entity-relationship diagram (ERD) to relational tables (Details can be found in object-relational impedance mismatch) and has to be reverse engineered. From a conceptual view, approaches for extraction can come from two directions. The first direction tries to extract or learn an OWL schema from the given database schema. Early approaches used a fixed amount of manually created mapping rules to refine the 1:1 mapping. More elaborate methods are employing heuristics or learning algorithms to induce schematic information (methods overlap with ontology learning). While some approaches try to extract the information from the structure inherent in the SQL schema (analysing e.g. foreign keys), others analyse the content and the values in the tables to create conceptual hierarchies (e.g. a columns with few values are candidates for becoming categories). The second direction tries to map the schema and its contents to a pre-existing domain ontology (see also: ontology alignment). Often, however, a suitable domain ontology does not exist and has to be created first.

=== XML ===
As XML is structured as a tree, any data can be easily represented in RDF, which is structured as a graph. XML2RDF is one example of an approach that uses RDF blank nodes and transforms XML elements and attributes to RDF properties. The topic however is more complex as in the case of relational databases. In a relational table the primary key is an ideal candidate for becoming the subject of the extracted triples. An XML element, however, can be transformed - depending on the context- as a subject, a predicate or object of a triple. XSLT can be used a standard transformation language to manually convert XML to RDF.

=== Survey of methods / tools ===
Name	Data Source	Data Exposition	Data Synchronisation	Mapping Language	Vocabulary Reuse	Mapping Automat.	Req. Domain Ontology	Uses GUI
A Direct Mapping of Relational Data to RDF	Relational Data	SPARQL/ETL	dynamic	—N/a	false	automatic	false	false
CSV2RDF4LOD	CSV	ETL	static	RDF	true	manual	false	false
CoNLL-RDF	TSV, CoNLL	SPARQL/ RDF stream	static	none	true	automatic (domain-specific, for use cases in language technology, preserves relations between rows)	false	false
Convert2RDF	Delimited text file	ETL	static	RDF/DAML	true	manual	false	true
D2R Server	RDB	SPARQL	bi-directional	D2R Map	true	manual	false	false
DartGrid	RDB	own query language	dynamic	Visual Tool	true	manual	false	true
DataMaster	RDB	ETL	static	proprietary	true	manual	true	true
Google Refine's RDF Extension	CSV, XML	ETL	static	none		semi-automatic	false	true
Krextor	XML	ETL	static	xslt	true	manual	true	false
MAPONTO	RDB	ETL	static	proprietary	true	manual	true	false
METAmorphoses	RDB	ETL	static	proprietary xml based mapping language	true	manual	false	true
MappingMaster	CSV	ETL	static	MappingMaster	true	GUI	false	true
ODEMapster	RDB	ETL	static	proprietary	true	manual	true	true
OntoWiki CSV Importer Plug-in - DataCube & Tabular	CSV	ETL	static	The RDF Data Cube Vocaublary	true	semi-automatic	false	true
Poolparty Extraktor (PPX)	XML, Text	LinkedData	dynamic	RDF (SKOS)	true	semi-automatic	true	false
RDBToOnto	RDB	ETL	static	none	false	automatic, the user furthermore has the chance to fine-tune results	false	true
RDF 123	CSV	ETL	static	false	false	manual	false	true
RDOTE	RDB	ETL	static	SQL	true	manual	true	true
Relational.OWL	RDB	ETL	static	none	false	automatic	false	false
T2LD	CSV	ETL	static	false	false	automatic	false	false
The RDF Data Cube Vocabulary	Multidimensional statistical data in spreadsheets			Data Cube Vocabulary	true	manual	false	
TopBraid Composer	CSV	ETL	static	SKOS	false	semi-automatic	false	true
Triplify	RDB	LinkedData	dynamic	SQL	true	manual	false	false
Ultrawrap	RDB	SPARQL/ETL	dynamic	R2RML	true	semi-automatic	false	true
Virtuoso RDF Views	RDB	SPARQL	dynamic	Meta Schema Language	true	semi-automatic	false	true
Virtuoso Sponger	structured and semi-structured data sources	SPARQL	dynamic	Virtuoso PL & XSLT	true	semi-automatic	false	false
VisAVis	RDB	RDQL	dynamic	SQL	true	manual	true	true
XLWrap: Spreadsheet to RDF	CSV	ETL	static	TriG Syntax	true	manual	false	false
XML to RDF	XML	ETL	static	false	false	automatic	false	false

== Extraction from natural language sources ==
The largest portion of information contained in business documents (about 80%) is encoded in natural language and therefore unstructured. Because unstructured data is rather a challenge for knowledge extraction, more sophisticated methods are required, which generally tend to supply worse results compared to structured data. The potential for a massive acquisition of extracted knowledge, however, should compensate the increased complexity and decreased quality of extraction. In the following, natural language sources are understood as sources of information, where the data is given in an unstructured fashion as plain text. If the given text is additionally embedded in a markup document (e. g. HTML document), the mentioned systems normally remove the markup elements automatically.

=== Linguistic annotation / natural language processing (NLP) ===
As a preprocessing step to knowledge extraction, it can be necessary to perform linguistic annotation by one or multiple NLP tools. Individual modules in an NLP workflow normally build on tool-specific formats for input and output, but in the context of knowledge extraction, structured formats for representing linguistic annotations have been applied.

Typical NLP tasks relevant to knowledge extraction include:

- part-of-speech (POS) tagging
- lemmatization (LEMMA) or stemming (STEM)
- word sense disambiguation (WSD, related to semantic annotation below)
- named entity recognition (NER, also see IE below)
- syntactic parsing, often adopting syntactic dependencies (DEP)
- shallow syntactic parsing (CHUNK): if performance is an issue, chunking yields a fast extraction of nominal and other phrases
- anaphor resolution (see coreference resolution in IE below, but seen here as the task to create links between textual mentions rather than between the mention of an entity and an abstract representation of the entity)
- semantic role labelling (SRL, related to relation extraction; not to be confused with semantic annotation as described below)
- discourse parsing (relations between different sentences, rarely used in real-world applications)

In NLP, such data is typically represented in TSV formats (CSV formats with TAB as separators), often referred to as CoNLL formats. For knowledge extraction workflows, RDF views on such data have been created in accordance with the following community standards:

- NLP Interchange Format (NIF, for many frequent types of annotation)
- Web Annotation (WA, often used for entity linking)
- CoNLL-RDF (for annotations originally represented in TSV formats)

Other, platform-specific formats include

- LAPPS Interchange Format (LIF, used in the LAPPS Grid)
- NLP Annotation Format (NAF, used in the NewsReader workflow management system)

=== Traditional information extraction (IE) ===
Traditional information extraction is a technology of natural language processing, which extracts information from typically natural language texts and structures these in a suitable manner. The kinds of information to be identified must be specified in a model before beginning the process, which is why the whole process of traditional Information Extraction is domain dependent. The IE is split in the following five subtasks.

- Named entity recognition (NER)
- Coreference resolution (CO)
- Template element construction (TE)
- Template relation construction (TR)
- Template scenario production (ST)

The task of named entity recognition is to recognize and to categorize all named entities contained in a text (assignment of a named entity to a predefined category). This works by application of grammar based methods or statistical models.

Coreference resolution identifies equivalent entities, which were recognized by NER, within a text. There are two relevant kinds of equivalence relationship. The first one relates to the relationship between two different represented entities (e.g. IBM Europe and IBM) and the second one to the relationship between an entity and their anaphoric references (e.g. it and IBM). Both kinds can be recognized by coreference resolution.

During template element construction the IE system identifies descriptive properties of entities, recognized by NER and CO. These properties correspond to ordinary qualities like red or big.

Template relation construction identifies relations, which exist between the template elements. These relations can be of several kinds, such as works-for or located-in, with the restriction, that both domain and range correspond to entities.

In the template scenario production events, which are described in the text, will be identified and structured with respect to the entities, recognized by NER and CO and relations, identified by TR.

=== Ontology-based information extraction (OBIE) ===
Ontology-based information extraction is a subfield of information extraction, with which at least one ontology is used to guide the process of information extraction from natural language text. The OBIE system uses methods of traditional information extraction to identify concepts, instances and relations of the used ontologies in the text, which will be structured to an ontology after the process. Thus, the input ontologies constitute the model of information to be extracted.

=== Ontology learning (OL) ===
Ontology learning is the automatic or semi-automatic creation of ontologies, including extracting the corresponding domain's terms from natural language text. As building ontologies manually is extremely labor-intensive and time-consuming, there is great motivation to automate the process.

=== Semantic annotation (SA) ===
During semantic annotation, natural language text is augmented with metadata (often represented in RDFa), which should make the semantics of contained terms machine-understandable. At this process, which is generally semi-automatic, knowledge is extracted in the sense, that a link between lexical terms and for example concepts from ontologies is established. Thus, knowledge is gained, which meaning of a term in the processed context was intended and therefore the meaning of the text is grounded in machine-readable data with the ability to draw inferences. Semantic annotation is typically split into the following two subtasks.

1. Terminology extraction
2. Entity linking

At the terminology extraction level, lexical terms from the text are extracted. For this purpose a tokenizer determines at first the word boundaries and solves abbreviations. Afterwards terms from the text, which correspond to a concept, are extracted with the help of a domain-specific lexicon to link these at entity linking.

In entity linking a link between the extracted lexical terms from the source text and the concepts from an ontology or knowledge base such as DBpedia is established. For this, candidate-concepts are detected appropriately to the several meanings of a term with the help of a lexicon. Finally, the context of the terms is analyzed to determine the most appropriate disambiguation and to assign the term to the correct concept.

Note that "semantic annotation" in the context of knowledge extraction is not to be confused with semantic parsing as understood in natural language processing (also referred to as "semantic annotation"): Semantic parsing aims a complete, machine-readable representation of natural language, whereas semantic annotation in the sense of knowledge extraction tackles only a very elementary aspect of that.

=== Tools ===
The following criteria can be used to categorize tools, which extract knowledge from natural language text.

Source	Which input formats can be processed by the tool (e.g. plain text, HTML or PDF)?
Access Paradigm	Can the tool query the data source or requires a whole dump for the extraction process?
Data Synchronization	Is the result of the extraction process synchronized with the source?
Uses Output Ontology	Does the tool link the result with an ontology?
Mapping Automation	How automated is the extraction process (manual, semi-automatic or automatic)?
Requires Ontology	Does the tool need an ontology for the extraction?
Uses GUI	Does the tool offer a graphical user interface?
Approach	Which approach (IE, OBIE, OL or SA) is used by the tool?
Extracted Entities	Which types of entities (e.g. named entities, concepts or relationships) can be extracted by the tool?
Applied Techniques	Which techniques are applied (e.g. NLP, statistical methods, clustering or machine learning)?
Output Model	Which model is used to represent the result of the tool (e. g. RDF or OWL)?
Supported Domains	Which domains are supported (e.g. economy or biology)?
Supported Languages	Which languages can be processed (e.g. English or German)?

The following table characterizes some tools for Knowledge Extraction from natural language sources.

Name	Source	Access Paradigm	Data Synchronization	Uses Output Ontology	Mapping Automation	Requires Ontology	Uses GUI	Approach	Extracted Entities	Applied Techniques	Output Model	Supported Domains	Supported Languages
	plain text, HTML, XML, SGML	dump	no	yes	automatic	yes	yes	IE	named entities, relationships, events	linguistic rules	proprietary	domain-independent	English, Spanish, Arabic, Chinese, indonesian
AlchemyAPI	plain text, HTML				automatic		yes	SA					multilingual
ANNIE	plain text	dump				yes	yes	IE		finite state algorithms			multilingual
ASIUM	plain text	dump			semi-automatic		yes	OL	concepts, concept hierarchy	NLP, clustering			
Attensity Exhaustive Extraction					automatic			IE	named entities, relationships, events	NLP			
Dandelion API	plain text, HTML, URL	REST	no	no	automatic	no	yes	SA	named entities, concepts	statistical methods	JSON	domain-independent	multilingual
DBpedia Spotlight	plain text, HTML	dump, SPARQL	yes	yes	automatic	no	yes	SA	annotation to each word, annotation to non-stopwords	NLP, statistical methods, machine learning	RDFa	domain-independent	English
EntityClassifier.eu	plain text, HTML	dump	yes	yes	automatic	no	yes	IE, OL, SA	annotation to each word, annotation to non-stopwords	rule-based grammar	XML	domain-independent	English, German, Dutch
FRED	plain text	dump, REST API	yes	yes	automatic	no	yes	IE, OL, SA, ontology design patterns, frame semantics	(multi-)word NIF or EarMark annotation, predicates, instances, compositional semantics, concept taxonomies, frames, semantic roles, periphrastic relations, events, modality, tense, entity linking, event linking, sentiment	NLP, machine learning, heuristic rules	RDF/OWL	domain-independent	English, other languages via translation
iDocument	HTML, PDF, DOC	SPARQL		yes			yes	OBIE	instances, property values	NLP		personal, business	
NetOwl Extractor	plain text, HTML, XML, SGML, PDF, MS Office	dump	No	Yes	Automatic	yes	Yes	IE	named entities, relationships, events	NLP	XML, JSON, RDF-OWL, others	multiple domains	English, Arabic Chinese (Simplified and Traditional), French, Korean, Persian (Farsi and Dari), Russian, Spanish
OntoGen					semi-automatic		yes	OL	concepts, concept hierarchy, non-taxonomic relations, instances	NLP, machine learning, clustering			
OntoLearn	plain text, HTML	dump	no	yes	automatic	yes	no	OL	concepts, concept hierarchy, instances	NLP, statistical methods	proprietary	domain-independent	English
OntoLearn Reloaded	plain text, HTML	dump	no	yes	automatic	yes	no	OL	concepts, concept hierarchy, instances	NLP, statistical methods	proprietary	domain-independent	English
OntoSyphon	HTML, PDF, DOC	dump, search engine queries	no	yes	automatic	yes	no	OBIE	concepts, relations, instances	NLP, statistical methods	RDF	domain-independent	English
ontoX	plain text	dump	no	yes	semi-automatic	yes	no	OBIE	instances, datatype property values	heuristic-based methods	proprietary	domain-independent	language-independent
OpenCalais	plain text, HTML, XML	dump	no	yes	automatic	yes	no	SA	annotation to entities, annotation to events, annotation to facts	NLP, machine learning	RDF	domain-independent	English, French, Spanish
PoolParty Extractor	plain text, HTML, DOC, ODT	dump	no	yes	automatic	yes	yes	OBIE	named entities, concepts, relations, concepts that categorize the text, enrichments	NLP, machine learning, statistical methods	RDF, OWL	domain-independent	English, German, Spanish, French
Rosoka	plain text, HTML, XML, SGML, PDF, MS Office	dump	Yes	Yes	Automatic	no	Yes	IE	named entity extraction, entity resolution, relationship extraction, attributes, concepts, multi-vector sentiment analysis, geotagging, language identification	NLP, machine learning	XML, JSON, POJO, RDF	multiple domains	Multilingual 200+ Languages
SCOOBIE	plain text, HTML	dump	no	yes	automatic	no	no	OBIE	instances, property values, RDFS types	NLP, machine learning	RDF, RDFa	domain-independent	English, German
SemTag	HTML	dump	no	yes	automatic	yes	no	SA		machine learning	database record	domain-independent	language-independent
smart FIX	plain text, HTML, PDF, DOC, e-Mail	dump	yes	no	automatic	no	yes	OBIE	named entities	NLP, machine learning	proprietary	domain-independent	English, German, French, Dutch, polish
Text2Onto	plain text, HTML, PDF	dump	yes	no	semi-automatic	yes	yes	OL	concepts, concept hierarchy, non-taxonomic relations, instances, axioms	NLP, statistical methods, machine learning, rule-based methods	OWL	deomain-independent	English, German, Spanish
Text-To-Onto	plain text, HTML, PDF, PostScript	dump			semi-automatic	yes	yes	OL	concepts, concept hierarchy, non-taxonomic relations, lexical entities referring to concepts, lexical entities referring to relations	NLP, machine learning, clustering, statistical methods			German
ThatNeedle	Plain Text	dump			automatic		no		concepts, relations, hierarchy	NLP, proprietary	JSON	multiple domains	English
The Wiki Machine	plain text, HTML, PDF, DOC	dump	no	yes	automatic	yes	yes	SA	annotation to proper nouns, annotation to common nouns	machine learning	RDFa	domain-independent	English, German, Spanish, French, Portuguese, Italian, Russian
ThingFinder								IE	named entities, relationships, events				multilingual

== Knowledge discovery ==
Knowledge discovery describes the process of automatically searching large volumes of data for patterns that can be considered knowledge about the data. It is often described as deriving knowledge from the input data. Knowledge discovery developed out of the data mining domain, and is closely related to it both in terms of methodology and terminology.

The most well-known branch of data mining is knowledge discovery, also known as knowledge discovery in databases (KDD). Just as many other forms of knowledge discovery it creates abstractions of the input data. The knowledge obtained through the process may become additional data that can be used for further usage and discovery. Often the outcomes from knowledge discovery are not actionable, techniques like domain driven data mining, aims to discover and deliver actionable knowledge and insights.

Another promising application of knowledge discovery is in the area of software modernization, weakness discovery and compliance which involves understanding existing software artifacts. This process is related to a concept of reverse engineering. Usually the knowledge obtained from existing software is presented in the form of models to which specific queries can be made when necessary. An entity relationship is a frequent format of representing knowledge obtained from existing software. Object Management Group (OMG) developed the specification Knowledge Discovery Metamodel (KDM) which defines an ontology for the software assets and their relationships for the purpose of performing knowledge discovery in existing code. Knowledge discovery from existing software systems, also known as software mining, is closely related to data mining, since existing software artifacts contain enormous value for risk management and business value, key for the evaluation and evolution of software systems. Instead of mining individual data sets, software mining focuses on metadata, such as process flows (e.g. data flows, control flows, & call maps), architecture, database schemas, and business rules/terms/process.

=== Input data ===
- Databases
  - Relational data
  - Database
  - Document warehouse
  - Data warehouse
- Software
  - Source code
  - Configuration files
  - Build scripts
- Text
  - Concept mining
- Graphs
  - Molecule mining
- Sequences
  - Data stream mining
  - Learning from time-varying data streams under concept drift
- Web

=== Output formats ===
- Data model
- Metadata
- Metamodels
- Ontology
- Knowledge representation
- Knowledge tags
- Business rule
- Knowledge Discovery Metamodel (KDM)
- Business Process Modeling Notation (BPMN)
- Intermediate representation
- Resource Description Framework (RDF)
- Software metrics

== See also ==
- Cluster analysis
- Data archaeology
