= Architecture-driven modernization =

Inititative of Object Management Group

Architecture-driven modernization in computing and computer science, is the name of an Object Management Group initiative (see OMG ADM Task Force website) focused on building and promoting standards for modernizing legacy systems. The objective of this initiative is to provide standardized representations of existing systems to enable common modernization activities, such as code analysis, comprehension, and software transformation.

== History ==
- In June 2003, the Object Management Group (OMG) formed a task force to model software within the context of existing systems. Initially, the group was called the Legacy Transformation Task Force, but the name was unanimously changed to Architecture-Driven Modernization Task Force (ADMTF). The ADMTF is co-chaired by Djenana Campara of KDM Analytics and William Ulrich of Tactical Strategy Group.
- In November 2003, the OMG's Architecture-Driven Modernization Task Force recommended, and the Platform Technical Committee issued, the Knowledge Discovery Metamodel Request For Proposal (RFP).
- In February 2005, the OMG's Architecture-Driven Modernization Task Force recommended, and the Platform Technical Committee issued, the Abstract Syntax Tree Metamodel (ASTM) Request For Proposal (RFP). This work is still in progress, and the OMG has not yet adopted this specification.
- In May 2006, the team's submission for the Knowledge Discovery Metamodel was adopted by the OMG and moved into the finalization stage of the standards adoption process. The adopted specification for KDM then became publicly available (OMG document ptc/06-06-07).
- In September 2006, the OMG's Architecture-Driven Modernization Task Force recommended, and the Platform Technical Committee issued, the Software Metrics Metamodel (SMM) Request For Proposal (RFP). This work is also currently in progress.
- In March 2007, the KDM Finalization Task Force completed the final stage of the OMG's standards adoption process. The recommended KDM 1.0 specification is now available from the OMG.

== Knowledge Discovery Metamodel (KDM) ==
The foundation of the Architecture-Driven Modernization initiative is the OMG specification Knowledge Discovery Metamodel (KDM). Typically, knowledge obtained from existing software is presented in the form of models that can be queried when necessary. An Entity Relationship Diagram is a common format of representing this knowledge. The Knowledge Discovery Metamodel defines an ontology for the software assets and their relationships to facilitate knowledge discovery within existing code. KDM Analytics maintains an open portal for the Knowledge Discovery Metamodel (see the KDM Portal).

== Relationship to MDA ==
Existing (or legacy) software has been one of the biggest obstacles to applying Model-Driven Architecture. Coincidentally, the acronym for Architecture-Driven Modernization (ADM) is MDA in reverse. MDA is the acronym for OMG's Model-Driven Architecture, which advocates for the use of models and transformations to deliver new software.

ADM is closely related to the concept of reverse engineering. Software modernization is considered architecture-driven when there is a need to capture and retool various architectural aspects of existing application environments. While this approach does not preclude source-to-source migrations where appropriate, it encourages organizations to approach modernization from an analysis and design based perspective. In doing so, project teams will ensure that obsolete concepts or designs are not propagated into modern languages and platforms. Ultimately, the results deliver in modernized systems that conform more effectively to current business practices and strategic requirements.

== Vendors ==
Some of the vendors providing Architecture-Driven Modernization software tooling & methods:

- Blu Age
- TSRI (The Software Revolution)
- Delta Software Technology

== See also ==
- Reverse engineering
- Software Metrics Metamodel
- Software mining
- Software modernization
