= Migration of the Serbs =

Migration of the Serbs may refer to:

- Great Migration of the Serbs (1690), a migration of Serbs during the Habsburg-Ottoman War (1683–1699)
- Great Migration of the Serbs (1737), a migration of Serbs during the Habsburg-Ottoman War (1737–1739)
- Demographic history of Serbia, during other historical periods
- Serbian diaspora, modern migration
- Theories on the early migrations of the Serbs, during the medieval period
- Migration of the Serbs (painting), by Paja Jovanović (1896)

== See also ==
- History of the Serbs
- Migration (disambiguation)
- Great Migration (disambiguation)
