= ADM =

Adm is an abbreviation for the naval rank of admiral.

ADM or A.D.M. may also refer to:

== Aviation ==
- Aéroports de Montréal, Quebec, Canada
- Aéroports du Mali, airport operator in Mali
- Agency debit memo in the travel industry
- Ardmore Municipal Airport in Oklahoma, US (IATA airport code ADM)
- Pilot decision making, also known as aeronautical decision-making
- Air data module

== Business ==
- Admiral Group, insurer, Cardiff, Wales, LSE symbol ADM
- American Dream Meadowlands, a mall in New Jersey, US
- Archer Daniels Midland, a food-processing company
- Astra Daihatsu Motor, an Indonesian automotive company

== Geography and transport ==
- Adisham railway station, Kent, England, station code
- Admiralty MRT station, Singapore, abbreviation
- Admiralty station (MTR), Hong Kong, station code
- Ardmore station (Oklahoma), Amtrak, station code

== Government ==
- Assyrian Democratic Movement, Iraq
- Autoroutes du Maroc, the national authority managing Morocco's expressways

== Science, technology and medicine ==
=== Biology and medicine ===
- Abductor digiti minimi muscle of hand
- Adrenomedullin, a vasodilator peptide hormone
- Acinar-to-ductal metaplasia, a condition affecting pancreatic cells (see Acinar cell § Acinar-to-ductal metaplasia)

=== Computing and telecommunications ===
- Adaptive delta modulation, a digital-to-analog data conversion technique
- Add-drop multiplexer, in optical fiber networks
- Administrative Template, in Microsoft Windows Group Policy deployment
- ADM-3A, a computer terminal manufactured by Lear Siegler
- Application development and maintenance in Lean IT
- Architecture Development Method, a component of The Open Group Architecture Framework
- Architecture-driven modernization of legacy software
- Automated decision-making

=== Other uses in science and technology ===
- ADM formalism of general relativity
- Ammonium dimolybdate
- Arrow diagramming method, a network-diagramming technique
- Atomic demolition munition
- Auto Dynamic Metering, Olympus OM-2 camera light metering

== Other uses ==
- Additional district magistrate, a civil service officer in India, below district magistrate
- Adel–De Soto–Minburn Community School District, in Adel, Iowa, US
- A.D.M. (album), by New Zealand band Snapper, 1996
- ADM (Amsterdam), a former squat in the Port of Amsterdam
- Alex de Minaur, an Australian professional tennis player

== See also ==
- AD/M-19 (Alianza Democrática M-19), a Colombian political party
- ADM-Aeolus, an ESA satellite
