= List of Linux adopters =

List of organizations and individuals who have adopted Linux

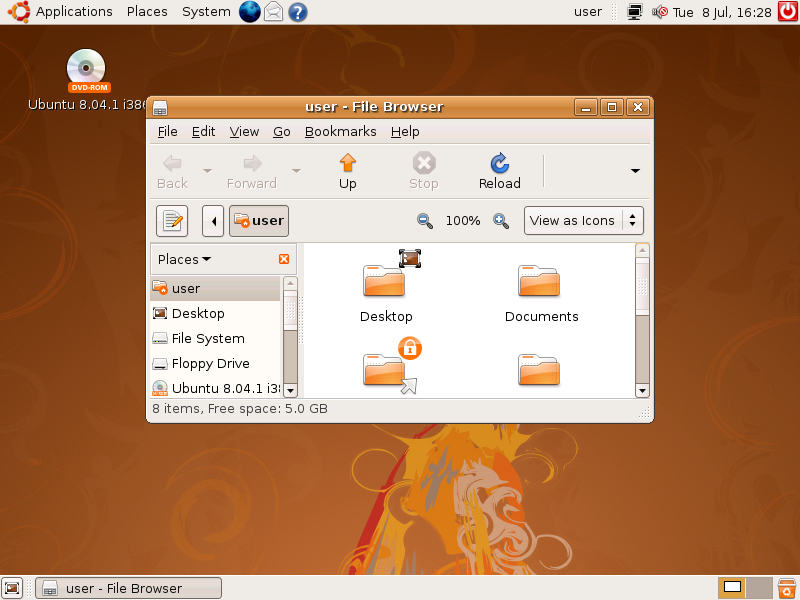
The French Parliament moved to Ubuntu on desktop PCs in 2007.

This is a list of companies, organizations, and individuals who have moved from other operating systems to Linux. On desktops, Linux has not displaced Microsoft Windows to a large degree. However, it is the leading operating system on servers.

== Government ==
As local governments come under pressure from institutions such as the World Trade Organization and the International Intellectual Property Alliance, some have turned to Linux and other free software as an affordable, legal alternative to both pirated software and expensive proprietary computer products from Microsoft, Apple, and other commercial companies. The spread of Linux affords some leverage for these countries when companies from the developed world bid for government contracts (since a low-cost option exists), while furnishing an alternative path to development for countries like India and Pakistan that have many citizens skilled in computer applications but cannot afford technological investment at "First World" prices. Cost is not the only factor being considered, though—many government institutions (public and military) in North America and the European Union make the transition to Linux because of its superior stability and the openness of the source code, which strengthens information security.

=== Africa ===
- In 2007, the first National Bank switched more than 12,000 desktop computers to Linux by 2007.
- In 2009, the South African Social Security Agency (SASSA) deployed multi-station Linux desktops to address budget and infrastructure constraints in 50 rural sites.

=== Asia ===
==== East ====
- The People's Republic of China exclusively uses Linux as the operating system for its Loongson processor family, with the aim of technology independence.
- Since 2006, the Kylin has been used by People's Liberation Army in The People's Republic of China. The first version used FreeBSD, but since release 3.0, it uses Linux.
- As of 2005, State-owned Industrial and Commercial Bank of China (ICBC) is installing Linux in all of its 20,000 retail branches as the basis for its web server and a new terminal platform.
- Since 2008, North Korea has used a Linux distribution developed by the Korea Computer Center, called Red Star OS, on their computers. Prior to its release, Red Hat Linux or Windows XP were used.

==== West ====
- In 2003, the Turkish government decided to create its own Linux distribution, Pardus, developed by UEKAE (National Research Institute of Electronics and Cryptology). The first version, Pardus 1.0, was officially announced on 27 December 2005.

==== South ====
- In 2002, the Government of Pakistan established a Technology Resource Mobilization Unit to enable groups of professionals to exchange views and coordinate activities in their sectors and to educate users about free software alternatives. Linux is an option for poor countries that have little revenue for public investment; Pakistan is using open-source software in public schools and colleges and hopes to run all government services on Linux eventually.
- In 2007, the Government of India's CDAC developed an Indian Linux distribution, Bharat Operating System Solutions (BOSS) GNU/Linux. It is customized to suit India's digital environment and supports most Indian languages.
- In March 2014, with the end of support for Windows XP, the Government of Tamil Nadu, India, has advised all its departments to install Bharat Operating System Solutions (BOSS) Linux.
- In 2021, the Government of Kerala, India, announced its official support for free/open-source software in its State IT Policy of 2001, which was formulated after the first-ever free software conference in India, "Freedom First!", held in July 2001 in Trivandrum, the capital of Kerala, where Richard Stallman inaugurated the Free Software Foundation of India. Since then, Kerala's IT policy has been significantly influenced by FOSS, with several major initiatives, such as KITE, possibly the largest single-purpose deployment of Linux in the world, leading to the formation of the International Centre for Free and Open Source Software (ICFOSS) in 2009.
- In 2023, India's Ministry of Defence will use Ubuntu-based Linux distribution Maya OS on all Internet-connected computers.

==== South-East ====
- In 2010, the Philippines fielded an Ubuntu-powered national voting system.
- In July 2010, Malaysia had switched 703 of the state's 724 agencies to free and open-source software with a Linux-based operating system used. The Chief Secretary to the Government cited, "(the) general acceptance of its promise of better quality, higher reliability, more flexibility, and lower cost".

=== Americas ===
==== North ====
===== Cuba =====
- In 2009, students from the University of Information Science in Cuba launched its own distribution of Linux called Nova to promote the replacement of Microsoft Windows on civilian and government computers, a project that is now supported by the Cuban Government. In early 2011, the Universidad de Ciencias Informáticas announced that they would migrate more than 8000 PCs to the new operating system.

===== U.S. =====
- In July 2001, the White House started switching whitehouse.gov to an operating system based on Red Hat Linux and using the Apache HTTP Server. The installation was completed in February 2009. In October 2009, the White House servers adopted Drupal, an open-source content management system software distribution.
- In April 2006, the US Federal Aviation Administration announced that it had completed a migration to Red Hat Enterprise Linux in one third of the scheduled time and about US$15 million under budget. The switch saved a further US$15 million in datacenter operating costs.
- By 2007, the United States Department of Defense (DoD) uses Linux - "the U.S. Army is the single largest installed base for Red Hat Linux" and the US Navy nuclear submarine fleet runs on Linux, including their sonar systems.
- By 2008, the US National Nuclear Security Administration operates the world's tenth fastest supercomputer, the IBM Roadrunner, which uses Red Hat Enterprise Linux along with Fedora as its operating systems.
- In June 2012, the US Navy signed a US$27,883,883 contract with Raytheon to install Linux ground control software for its fleet of vertical take-off and landing (VTOL) Northrop Grumman MQ-8 Fire Scout drones. The contract involves Naval Air Station Patuxent River, Maryland, which has already spent US$5,175,075 in preparation for the Linux systems.

==== South ====
- The government of the Argentinian province of Misiones uses workstations that run GobMis GNU/Linux, a distribution with necessary tools for public administration. Also delivers a "generic" distribution without government branding known as "GobLin GNU/Linux".
- Brazil uses PC Conectado, a program utilizing Linux.
- In 2004, Venezuela's government approved the 3390 decree, to give preference to using free software in public administration. One result of this policy is the development of Canaima, a Debian-based Linux distribution.

=== Europe ===
==== Austria ====
- In 2005, Austria's city of Vienna chose to start migrating its desktop PCs to Debian-based Wienux. However, by 2011, the idea was largely abandoned because the necessary software was incompatible with Linux.

==== Czech Republic ====
- In 2005, Česká pošta (Czech Post) migrated 4,000 servers and 12,000 clients to Novell Linux.

==== France ====
- In 2007, France's national police force (the National Gendarmerie) started moving their 90,000 desktops from Windows XP to a Ubuntu-based OS, GendBuntu, over concerns about the additional training costs of moving to Windows Vista, and following the success of OpenOffice.org roll-outs. The force saved about €50 million on software licensing between 2004 and 2008. The migration largely completed in 2014.
- By 2007, France's Ministry of Agriculture uses Mandriva Linux.
- In 2007, The French Parliament switched to using Ubuntu on desktop PCs. However, in 2012, it was decided to let each Member of Parliament choose between Windows and Linux.

==== Germany ====
- In 2003, the city government of Munich, Germany, chose to migrate its 14,000 desktops to Debian-based LiMux. Even though more than 80 percent of workstations used OpenOffice and 100 percent used Firefox/Thunderbird five years later (November 2008), an adoption rate of Linux of only 20 percent (June 2010) was achieved. The effort was later reorganized, focusing on smaller deployments and winning over staff to the value of the program. By the end of 2011 the program had exceeded its goal and changed over 9000 desktops to Linux. The city of Munich reported at the end of 2012 that the migration to Linux was highly successful and has already saved the city over €11 million (US$14 million). Recently the Deputy Mayor Josef Schmid said that the city is putting together an independent expert group to look at moving back to Microsoft due to issues in LiMux, the primary issues have been of compatibility; users in the rest of Germany that use other (Microsoft) software have had trouble with the files generated by Munich's open-source applications. The second is price, with Schmid saying that the city now has the impression that "Linux is very expensive" due to custom programming. The independent group advise the best course of action, and if that group recommends using Microsoft software, Schmid says that a switch back isn't impossible. The city council said they already saved more than US$10 million, and there is no major issue with the switch to Linux. Some observers, such as Silviu Stahie of Softpedia have indicated that the attempted rejection of Linux has been influenced by Microsoft and its supporters and that this is predominantly a political issue and not a technical one. Microsoft's German headquarters has committed to move to Munich as part of this issue. In 2017, the Munich city council voted to transition back to Microsoft Windows 10, citing compatibility issues with LiMux and the high cost of custom programming. By 2020, the city had begun the full migration of its workstations to Windows 10, with plans to complete the transition by 2023. Critics argued that the decision was influenced by political pressures and lobbying rather than purely technical issues. Nonetheless, the transition continued, marking the end of Munich's ambitious open-source LiMux project. The cost of the switch was estimated to be over €30 million, despite earlier savings from using Linux. A significant number of workstations in other government institutions, such as the Federal Employment Office of Germany (Bundesagentur für Arbeit), continue to use Linux, with 13,000 public workstations running openSUSE.
- By 2009, the Federal Employment Office of Germany (Bundesagentur für Arbeit) had migrated 13,000 public workstations from Windows NT to openSUSE.
- In 2024, the State of Schleswig-Holstein in Germany plans to replace Windows with Linux and Libreoffice.

==== Iceland ====
- In March 2012, Iceland announced it wishes to migrate to open-source software in public institutions. Schools have already migrated from Windows to Ubuntu Linux.

==== North Macedonia ====
- In 2009, Republic of North Macedonia's Ministry of Education and Science deployed more than 180,000 Ubuntu-based classroom desktops, and has encouraged every student in the Republic of North Macedonia to use Ubuntu computer workstations.

==== The Netherlands ====
- Since 2003, the Dutch Police Internet Research and Investigation Network (iRN) has only used free and open-source software based on open standards, publicly developed with the source code available on the Internet for audit. They use 2,200 Ubuntu workstations.

==== Russia ====
- In late 2010, Vladimir Putin signed a plan to move the Russian Federation government towards free software including Linux in the second quarter of 2012.
- In 2014, Russia announced plans to move their Ministry of Health to Linux as a counter to sanctions over the annexation of Crimea by the Russian Federation and a means of hurting US corporate interests, such as Microsoft.
- In 2018, Russia began adopting Astra Linux, an operating system that is certified to handle data classified as "special importance," on their military computer systems.

==== Spain ====
- In 2003, Spain was noted as the furthest along the road to Linux adoption, for example, with Linux distribution LinEx
- In 2004, the regional Andalusian Autonomous Government of Andalucía in Spain developed its own Linux distribution, called Guadalinex.
- In 2008, the city government of Barcelona in Spain announced that it would migrate all desktop software from proprietary to free/open-source alternatives, and would gradually migrate from proprietary operating systems to Linux.

==== Switzerland ====
- In 2001, Switzerland's Canton of Solothurn decided to migrate its computers to Linux, but in 2010 the Swiss authority has made a U-turn by deciding to use Windows 7 for desktop clients.

==== United Kingdom ====
- In 2020, during the COVID-19 pandemic, Hackney London Borough Council used Linux laptops for its 4000 employees to allow working from home.

== Education ==
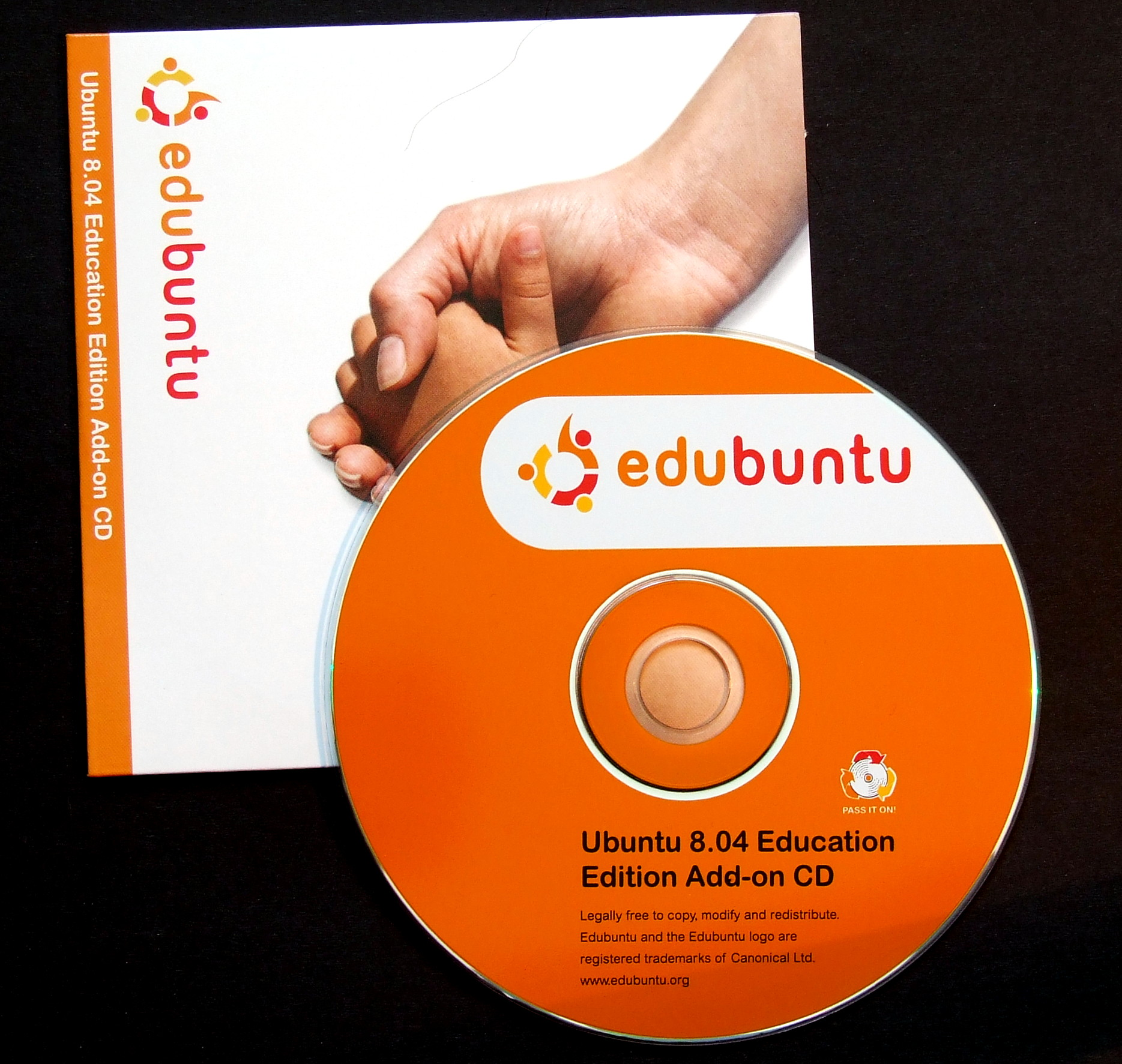
Edubuntu CD kit

Linux is often used in technical disciplines at universities and research centres. This is due to several factors, including that Linux scales to run on very large systems that small home computer operating systems cannot. Rarely are 'license costs' or cost of software issues. The U.S. Department of Defense (DoD) uses Linux on its supercomputers because of security, stability, and scalability. The DoD can afford licenses from anyone and doesn't worry about the cost. To some extent, technical competence of computer science and software engineering academics is also a contributor, as is stability, maintainability, and upgradability. IBM ran an advertising campaign entitled "Linux is Education" featuring a young boy who was supposed to be "Linux".

Examples of large-scale adoption of Linux in education include the following:

- The OLPC XO-1 (also called the MIT $100 laptop and The Children's Machine), is a low-cost laptop running Linux, to be distributed to millions of children, more so in developing countries, as part of the One Laptop Per Child project.

=== Europe ===
==== Germany ====
- In 2012, the Leibniz-Rechenzentrum (Leibniz Supercomputing Centre) (LRZ) of the Bavarian Academy of Sciences and Humanities unveiled the SuperMUC, the world's fourth most powerful supercomputer. The computer is x86-based and features 155,000 processor cores with a maximum speed of 3 petaflops of processing power and 324 terabytes of RAM. Its operating system is SUSE Linux Enterprise Server.
- In 2015, Germany announced that 560,000 students in 33 universities will migrate to Linux.

==== Italy ====
- In September 2005, Schools in Bolzano, Italy, with a student population of 16,000, switched to a custom distribution of Linux, FUSS Soledad (GNU/Linux).
- In spring 2016 the Italian city of Vicenza switched to Zorin OS (which itself is based on Ubuntu).

==== North Macedonia ====
- In December 2005, Republic of North Macedonia deployed 5,000 Linux desktops running Ubuntu across all 468 public schools and 182 computer labs. Later in 2007, another 180,000 Ubuntu thin client computers were deployed.

==== United Kingdom ====
- In 2004, Orwell High School, a school with about 1,000 students in Felixstowe, England, switched to Linux. The school has just received Specialist School for Technology status through a government initiative.
- In 2013, Westcliff High School for Girls in the United Kingdom successfully moved from Windows to openSUSE.

==== Spain ====
- Linkat (Education sector in Catalunya)
- Max (Education sector in Madid)
- Vitalinux (Education sector Zaragoz)
- LliureX (Education sector Valencia)

==== Switzerland ====
- In 2013, all primary and secondary public schools in the Swiss Canton of Geneva switched to using Ubuntu for the PCs used by teachers and students. The switch has been completed by all of the 170 primary public schools and over 2,000 computers. The migration of the canton's 20 secondary schools is planned for the school year 2014-15

=== Americas ===
- Brazil has 35 million students in over 50,000 schools using 523,400 computer stations, all running Linux.
- In 2006, 22,000 students in the US state of Indiana had access to Linux workstations at their high schools.
- In 2009, Venezuela's Ministry of Education began a project called Canaima-educativo to provide all students in public schools with "Canaimita" laptop computers with the Canaima Debian-based Linux distribution pre-installed, as well as with open-source educational content.
- In 2021, Argentina's government (Conectar Igualdad) issued laptops to public education students uses Huayra GNU/Linux, a Linux distribution specialised for education.

=== Asia ===
==== China ====
- The Chinese government started buying 1.5 million Linux Loongson PCs as part of its plans to support its domestic industry. In addition, the province of Jiangsu planned to install as many as 150,000 Linux PCs, using Loongson processors, in rural schools starting in 2009.

==== Indonesia ====
- By December 2013, about 500 Indonesian schools were running openSUSE.

==== Georgia ====
- In 2004, Georgia began running all its school computers and LTSP thin clients on Linux, mainly using Kubuntu, Ubuntu and stripped Fedora-based distros.

==== India ====
- In 2010, the Indian government's tablet computer initiative for student use employs Linux as the operating system as part of its drive to produce a tablet PC for under 1,500 rupees (US$35).
- In 2015, government officials of Kerala, India announced they will use only free software, running on the Linux platform, for computer education, starting with the 2,650 government and government-aided high schools.
- In 2015, the Indian state of Tamil Nadu has issued a directive to local government departments asking them to switch over to open-source software in the wake of Microsoft's decision to end support for Windows XP in April 2014.
- In 2020, the Indian state of Tamil Nadu plans to distribute 100,000 Linux laptops to its students.

==== Philippines ====
- In 2007, the Philippines deployed 13,000 desktops running on Fedora, the first 10,000 were delivered in December 2007 by Advanced Solutions Inc. Another 10,000 desktops of Edubuntu and Kubuntu are planned.

=== Russia ===
- In October 2007, Russia announced all its school computers will run on Linux. This is to avoid cost of licensing currently unlicensed software.

== Home ==
- In 2006, Sony's PlayStation 3 was released and came with a hard disk (20 GB, 60 GB or 80 GB) and was specially designed to allow easy installation of Linux on the system. However, Linux was prevented from accessing certain functions of the PlayStation, such as 3D graphics. Sony also released a Linux kit for its PlayStation 2 console (see Linux for PlayStation 2). PlayStation hardware running Linux has been occasionally used in small scale distributed computing experiments due to the ease of installation and the relatively low price of a PS3 compared to other hardware choices offering similar performance. As of April 1, 2010, Sony disabled the ability to install Linux "due to security concerns" starting with firmware version 3.21.
- Android, created by Google in 2007, is the smartphone & tablet operating system that, as of late 2013, runs on 80% of smartphones and 60% of tablets, worldwide; it is pre-installed on devices by brand hardware manufacturers.
- Through 2007 and 2008, Linux distributions with an emphasis on ease of use, such as Ubuntu became increasingly popular as home desktop operating systems, with some OEMs, such as Dell, offering models with Ubuntu or other Linux distributions on desktop systems.
- In 2008, many netbook models were shipped with Linux installed, usually with a lightweight distribution, such as Xandros or Linpus, to reduce resource consumption on their limited resources.
- In 2011, Google introduced its Chromebooks, thin clients based on Linux and supplyiedjust a web browser, file manager and media player. They also have the ability to remote desktop into other computers via the free Chrome Remote Desktop extension. In 2012 the first Chromebox, a desktop equivalent of the Chromebook, was introduced. By 2013 Chromebooks had captured 20-25% of the US market for sub-$300 laptops.
- In 2013, Valve publicly released ports of Steam and the Source engine to Linux, allowing many popular titles by Valve such as Team Fortress 2 and Half-Life 2 to be played on Linux. Later that same year, Valve announced their upcoming Steam Machine consoles, which would by default run SteamOS, an operating system based on the Linux kernel. Valve has created a compatibility layer called Proton. Proton makes it possible to run many games on Linux.

== Businesses and non-profits ==
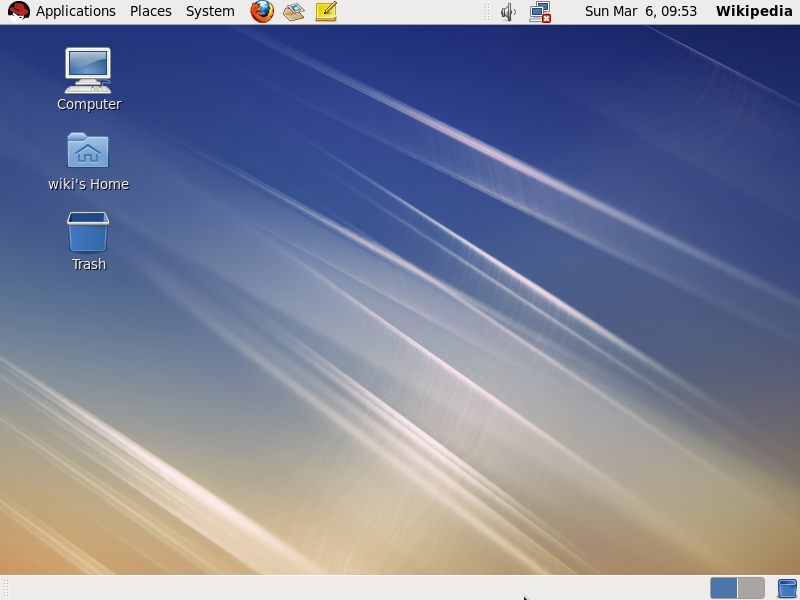
Ernie Ball moved its entire business to Red Hat Linux in 2000, following a licensing dispute with Microsoft.

Linux is used extensively on servers in businesses and has been for a long time. Linux is also used in some corporate environments as the desktop platform for their employees, with commercially available solutions including Red Hat Enterprise Linux, SUSE Linux Enterprise Desktop, and Ubuntu.

- Free I.T. Athens, founded in 2005 in Athens, Georgia, United States, is a non-profit organization dedicated to rescuing computers from landfills, recycling them or refurbishing them using Linux exclusively.
- Burlington Coat Factory has used Linux exclusively since 1999.
- Ernie Ball, known for its famous Super Slinky guitar strings, has used Linux as its desktop operating system since 2000.
- Novell is undergoing a migration from Windows to Linux. Of its 5500 employees, 50% were successfully migrated as of April 2006. This was expected to rise to 80% by November.
- Wotif, the Australian hotel booking website, migrated from Windows to Linux servers to keep up with the growth of its business.
- Union Bank of California announced in January 2007 that it would standardize its IT infrastructure on Red Hat Enterprise Linux in order to lower costs.
- WhatsApp is mostly known to run its infrastructure on CentOS since its acquisition by Meta. WhatsApp initially ran on FreeBSD.
- Netflix is known to have its infrastructure running on FreeBSD.
- Tesla Motors, has equipped the multimedia touchscreen of its Tesla cars with a Ubuntu-based embedded computer.
- Peugeot, the European car maker, announced plans to deploy up to 20,000 copies of Novell's Linux desktop, SUSE Linux Enterprise Desktop, and 2,500 copies of SUSE Linux Enterprise Server, in 2007.
- Mindbridge, a software company, announced in September 2007 that it had migrated a large number of Windows servers onto a smaller number of Linux servers and a few BSD servers. It claims to have saved "bunches of money."
- Virgin America, the low cost U.S. airline, uses Linux to power its in-flight entertainment system, RED.
- Amazon.com, the US based mail-order retailer, uses Linux "in nearly every corner of its business".
- Google uses a version of Ubuntu internally nicknamed Goobuntu. In August 2017, Google announced that it would be replacing Goobuntu with gLinux, an in-house distro based on the Debian Testing branch.
- IBM does extensive development work for Linux and also uses it on desktops and servers internally. The company also created a TV advertising campaign: IBM supports Linux 100%.
- Wikimedia Foundation moved to running its Wikipedia servers on Ubuntu in late 2008; formerly it used a mix of Red Hat and Fedora.
- DreamWorks Animation adopted the use of Linux since 2001, and uses more than 1,000 Linux desktops and more than 3,000 Linux servers.
- The Chicago Mercantile Exchange employs an all-Linux computing infrastructure and has used it to process over a quadrillion dollars' worth of financial transactions
- The Chi-X pan-European equity exchange runs its MarketPrizm trading platform software on Linux.
- The London Stock Exchange uses the Linux-based MillenniumIT Millennium Exchange software for its trading platform and predicts that moving to Linux from Windows will give it an annual cost savings of at least £10 million ($14.7 million) from 2011 to 2012.
- The New York Stock Exchange uses Linux to run its trading applications.
- Mobexpert Group, the leading furniture manufacturer and retailer in Romania, extensively uses Linux, LibreOffice, and other free software in its data communications and processing systems, including some desktops.
- American electronic music composer Kim Cascone migrated from Apple Mac to Ubuntu for his music studio, performances, and administration in 2009.
- Laughing Boy Records under the direction of owner Geoff Beasley switched from doing audio recording on Windows to Linux in 2004 as a result of Windows spyware problems.
- Nav Canada's new Internet Flight Planning System for roll-out in 2011, is written in Python and runs on Red Hat Linux.
- Electrolux Frigidaire Infinity i-kitchen is a "smart appliance" refrigerator that uses a Linux operating system, running on an embedded 400 MHz Freescale i.MX25 processor with 128 MB of RAM and a 480×800 touch panel.
- DukeJets LLC (USA) and Duke Jets Ltd. (Canada), air charter brokerage companies, switched from Windows to Ubuntu Linux in 2012.
- Banco do Brasil, the biggest bank in Brazil, has moved nearly all desktops to Linux, except some corporate ones and a few that are need to operate some specific hardware. They began migration of their servers to Linux in 2002. Branch servers and ATMs all run Linux. The distribution of choice is openSUSE 11.2.
- KLM, the Royal Aviation Company of the Netherlands, uses Linux on the OSS-based version of its KLM WebFarm.
- Ocado, the online supermarket, uses Linux in its data centres.
- Kazi Farms Group, a large poultry and food products company in Bangladesh, migrated 1000 computers to Linux. An associated TV channel, Deepto TV, as well as an associated daily newspaper,Dhaka Tribune also migrated to Linux.
- Zando Computer, an IT consulting company located in Bucharest, Romania uses Linux for its business needs (server and desktop). The company recommends to its clients and actively deploys Linux, LibreOffice (OpenDocument format solutions) and other categories of free software.
- Nvidia, at the 2015 Consumer Electronics Show, company CEO Jen-Hsun Huang made his extensive presentations using Ubuntu Linux.
- Statistical Office of the Republic of Serbia information and communications technology (ICT) report for 2017, showed that 19.8% of the companies in Serbia use Linux as their main operating system (up from 14.5% in 2016). Linux is used mostly in large enterprises (those fulfilling two out of three conditions: 250+ employees, revenue of 35+ million euros, total assets of 17.5+ million euros), where Linux adoption has reached 40.9%.
- Arab contractors employees pension fund (ACEPF), Cairo, Egypt, Web site department use an ubuntu web application server to develop their application, since 2015.

== Scientific institutions ==
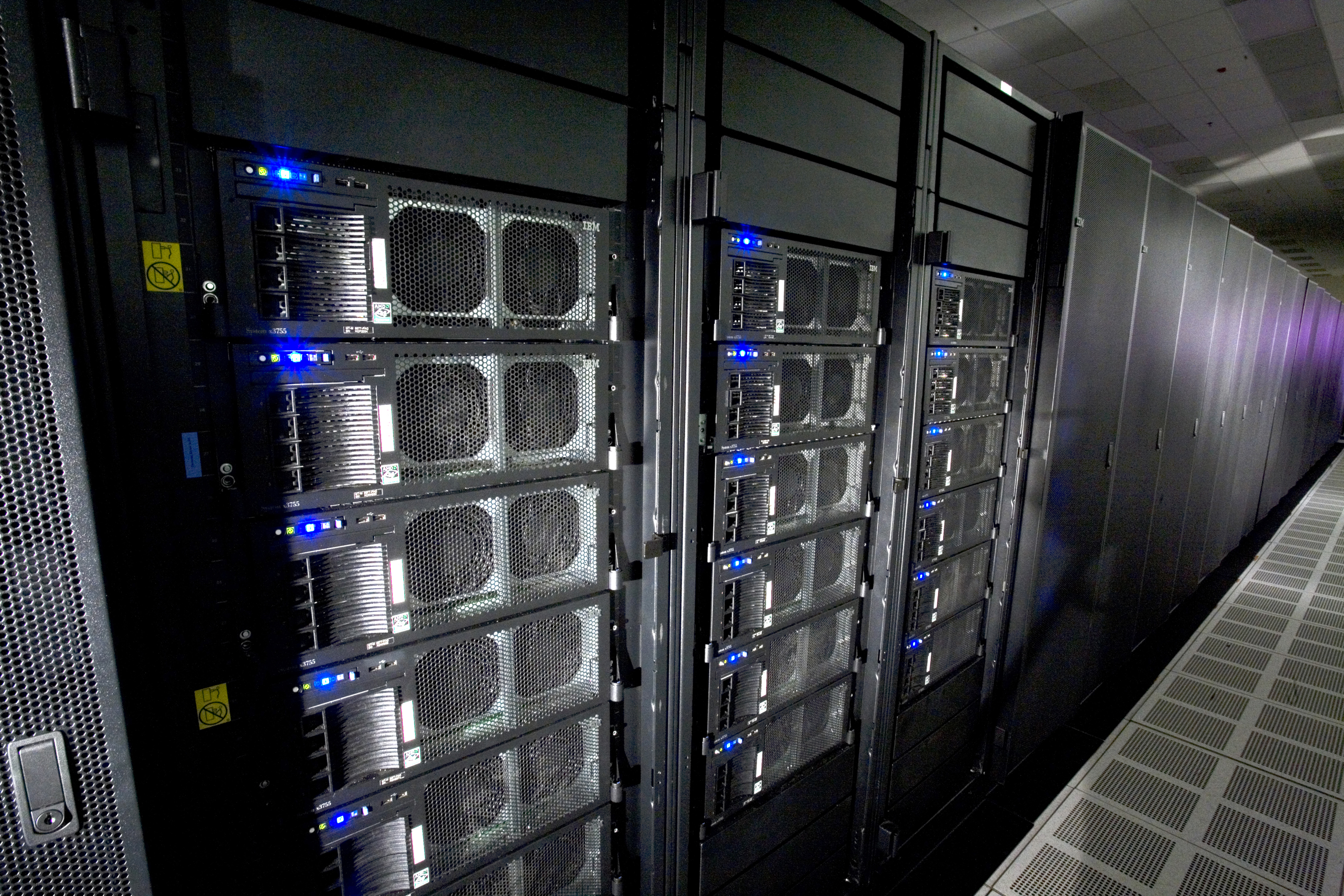
The IBM Roadrunner, the world's third fastest supercomputer operated by the US National Nuclear Security Administration, uses Red Hat Enterprise Linux and Fedora as its operating systems. All (top 500) supercomputers use Linux by now.

- In 2013, NASA decided to switch the International Space Station laptops running Windows XP to Debian 6.
- Both CERN and Fermilab at one time used Scientific Linux in all their work; this included running the Large Hadron Collider and the Dark Energy Camera as well as the 20,000 internal servers at CERN. With the discontinuation of Scientific Linux (announced in 2019, with support only for SL6 and SL7 until end of life), CERN now uses Red Hat Enterprise Linux (RHEL) and AlmaLinux, as well as CentOS 7 (until 30 June 2024); whereas Fermilab uses RHEL and AlmaLinux, as well as Scientific Linux (until end of life in June 2024).
- WLCG is composed of 576 sites with more than 390,000 processors and 150 petabytes of storage and uses Linux on all its nodes.
- As of 2009, Canada's largest super computer, the IBM iDataPlex cluster computer at the University of Toronto uses Linux as its operating system.
- The Internet Archive uses hundreds of x86 servers to catalogue the Internet, all of them running Linux.
- ASV Roboat autonomous robotic sailboat runs on Linux
- As of October 2010, Tianhe-I, the world's fastest super computer, located at the National Centre for Supercomputing in Tianjin, China runs Linux.
- The University of Portsmouth in the United Kingdom has deployed a "cost effective" high performance computer that will be used to analyse data from telescopes around the world, run simulations and test the current theories about the universe. Its operating system is Scientific Linux. Dr. David Bacon of the University of Portsmouth said: "Our Institute of Cosmology is in a great position to use this high-performance computer to make real breakthroughs in understanding the universe, both by analysing the very latest astronomical observations and by calculating the consequences of mind-boggling new theories...By selecting Dell’s industry-standard hardware and open-source software, a free up budget was setup that would have normally been spent on costly licences and reinvest it."
- In September 2011, ten autonomous unmanned air vehicles were flown in flocking flight by the École Polytechnique Fédérale de Lausanne’s Laboratory of Intelligence Systems in Lausanne, Switzerland. The UAVs each sense each other and control their own flight in relation to each other and have an independent processor running Linux to accomplish this.

== Celebrities ==
- In August 2012, British actor Stephen Fry stated that he uses Linux. "Do I use Linux on any of my devices? Yes—I use Ubuntu these days; it seems the friendliest."
- In 2008, Jamie Hyneman, co-host of the American television series MythBusters, advocated Linux-based operating systems as a solution to software bloat.
- Science fiction writer Cory Doctorow uses Ubuntu.
- Actor Wil Wheaton sometimes uses Linux distributions, but not as his primary operating system.
- In 2024, Swedish YouTuber PewDiePie stated that he had switched to using Linux after becoming frustrated with Microsoft Windows, praising Linux for its lack of bloatware, customization options, and improved gaming support through Valve's Proton.

== See also ==
- Comparison of open source and closed source
