= Enterprise coexistence =

Enterprise coexistence refers to the means for users on different remote systems to communicate with each other seamlessly. This new technology is only just beginning to appear commercially. As a result, it's identified differently by different companies (Amazon WorkMail calls it 'interoperability', Dell calls it coexistence, and Cloudiway calls it both coexistence and enterprise coexistence, while BitTitan calls it enterprise coexistence: Binary Tree has opted to market each aspect of enterprise coexistence as individual products).

Enterprise coexistence solutions usually include calendar free/busy scheduling as well as global address list management on each remote system. Additional features also exist, such as mail routing. The remote systems during enterprise coexistence do not need to be the same type, allowing interoperability between considerably different remote systems, such as G Suite and Exchange, whether cloud-based or on-premises.

Each remote system communicates through a dedicated coexistence server, which acts as an interpreter between the two, passing information between systems in a format they recognize and accept. Each system them passes the details back to the source of the request.

Enterprise coexistence is primarily used by businesses during mergers, acquisitions and specific collaborations. Some businesses opt to use coexistence long-term. It's also gaining popularity as a solution when moving business software tools from on-premises-based software to the cloud (such as G Suite and Office 365), which is due to see an increase in 2017 and beyond.

== Component details ==
Free/busy scheduling allows users to query the availability of external users or resources (such as rooms and equipment). For example, if Jill at Business A proposes a time and date for a meeting with a Jack at Business B, she can check if Jack is free by sending a calendar look-up request, then adjust the meeting time accordingly. Her server sends a message to the coexistence server which acts as a user at Business B to query Jack's calendar. When Business B's server provides the information to the coexistence server, the coexistence server passes this back to Jill at Business A. This can save time when setting up meetings between multiple people at different businesses.

Global address list management ensures that each server has an up-to-date and synchronized version of all users from all coexisting servers. For example, if Jack leaves Business B and his account is deleted, the global address list at Business B will be updated. The coexistence server will check for updates periodically, then automatically update the global address list at Business A so that the two are once again synchronized. Deletions, changes and additions are synchronized, so if Jack were valuable enough to be replaced, his replacement's details would also be added to the address list both locally at Business B and at Business A.

Mail routing during enterprise coexistence allows more than one remote server to share a single domain name. Although some examples of long-term usage may exist, mail routing is normally implemented during mergers or acquisitions, when data migration to a single remote system is planned (transitional coexistence).
