= Knowledge Discovery Metamodel =

Specification of Object Management Group

Knowledge Discovery Metamodel (KDM) is a publicly available specification from the Object Management Group (OMG). KDM is a common intermediate representation for existing software systems and their operating environments, that defines common metadata required for deep semantic integration of Application Lifecycle Management tools. KDM was designed as the OMG's foundation for software modernization, IT portfolio management and software assurance. KDM uses OMG's Meta-Object Facility to define an XMI interchange format between tools that work with existing software as well as an abstract interface (API) for the next-generation assurance and modernization tools. KDM standardizes existing approaches to knowledge discovery in software engineering artifacts, also known as software mining.

== History ==
- In November 2003, the OMG's Architecture-Driven Modernization Task Force recommended, and the Platform Technical Committee issued, the Knowledge Discovery Metamodel (KDM) RFP. The objective of this RFP was to provide a common repository structure to represent information about existing software assets and their operating environment. The goal of KDM was defined as exchanging information related to transformation of existing software assets. The RFP stated that KDM shall provide the ability to document existing systems, discover reusable components in existing software, support transformations to other languages and to MDA, or enable other potential transformations. The Knowledge Discovery Metamodel will also enable information about existing software artifacts to be exchanged among different tools. This will enable vendors that specialize on certain languages, platforms or types of transformations to deliver customer solutions in conjunction with other vendors.
- The original KDM RFP is available to OMG members for download.
- Throughout 2004 and 2005 12 companies collaborated to prepare a joint response to the KDM RFP. More than 30 organizations from 5 countries have contributed to the development and review of the KDM specification.
- In May 2006, the Team's submission—the Knowledge Discovery Metamodel (KDM) -- moved into the finalization stage of the OMG's standards adoption process. The OMG adopted Specification for KDM became publicly available (OMG document ptc/06-06-07).
- In March 2007 the KDM Finalization Task Force finished the finalization stage of the OMG's standards adoption process. The formal KDM specification KDM 1.0 is available from OMG.
- The latest version of the spec was finalized in July 2011, making KDM 1.3 the most recent version.
- KDM Analytics maintains open portal for KDM news, reference and education materials and tools

== Overview ==
The goal of KDM is to ensure interoperability between tools for maintenance, evolution, assessment and modernization. KDM is defined as a metamodel that can be also viewed as an ontology for describing the key aspects of knowledge related to the various facets of enterprise software. KDM support means investment into the KDM ecosystem – a growing open-standard based cohesive community of tool vendors, service providers, and commercial components.

KDM represents entire enterprise software systems, not just code. KDM is a wide-spectrum entity–relationship representation for describing existing software. KDM represents structural and behavior elements of existing software systems. The key concept of KDM is a container: an entity that owns other entities. This allows KDM to represent existing systems at various degrees of granularity.

KDM defines precise semantic foundation for representing behavior, the so-called micro-KDM. It provides a high-fidelity intermediate representation which can be used, for example, for performing static analysis of existing software systems. micro-KDM is similar in purpose to a virtual machine for KDM, although KDM is not an executable model, or a constraint model, but a representation of existing artifacts for analysis purposes.

KDM facilitates incremental analysis of existing software systems, where the initial KDM representation is analyzed and more pieces of knowledge are extracted and made explicit as KDM to KDM transformation performed entirely within the KDM technology space. The steps of the knowledge extraction process can be performed by tools, and may involve the analyst.

KDM is the uniform language- and platform- independent representation. Its extensibility mechanism allows addition of domain-, application- and implementation-specific knowledge.

== Architecture ==
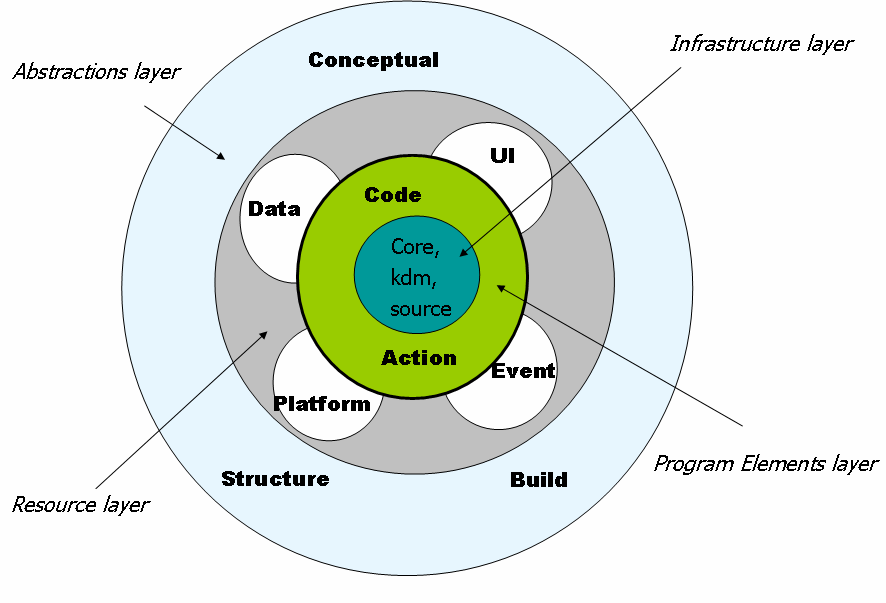
Knowledge Discovery Metamodel consists of 12 packages arranged into 4 layers.

KDM packages are arranged into the following four layers:

=== Infrastructure Layer ===
The KDM Infrastructure Layer consists of the Core, kdm, and Source packages which provide a small common core for all other packages, the inventory model of the artifacts of the existing system and full traceability between the meta-model elements as links back to the source code of the artifacts, as well as the uniform extensibility mechanism. The Core package determines several of the patterns that are reused by other KDM packages. Although KDM is a meta-model that uses Meta-Object Facility, there is an alignment between the KDM Core and Resource Description Framework (RDF).

=== Program Elements Layer ===
The Program Elements Layer consists of the Code and Action packages.

- The Code package represents programming elements as determined by programming languages, for example data types, procedures, classes, methods, variables, etc. This package is similar in purpose to the Common Application Meta-model (CAM) from another OMG specification, called Enterprise Application Integration (EAI). KDM Code package provides greater level of detail and is seamlessly integrated with the architecturally significant views of the software system. Representation of datatypes in KDM is aligned with ISO standard ISO/IEC 11404 (see also General Purpose Datatypes).
- The Action package captures the low level behavior elements of applications, including detailed control- and data flow between statements. Code and Action package in combination provide a high-fidelity intermediate representation of each component of the enterprise software system

=== Resource Layer ===
The Resource Layer represents the operational environment of the existing software system. It is related to the area of Enterprise Application Integration (EAI).

- Platform package represents the operating environment of the software, related to the operating system, middleware, etc. including the control flows between components as they are determined by the runtime platform
- UI package represents the knowledge related to the user interfaces of the existing software system
- Event package represents the knowledge related to events and state-transition behavior of the existing software system
- Data package represents the artifacts related to persistent data, such as indexed files, relational databases, and other kinds of data storage. These assets are key to enterprise software as they represent the enterprise metadata. The KDM Data package is aligned with another OMG specification, called Common Warehouse Metamodel (CWM)

=== Abstractions Layer ===
The Abstraction Layer represents domain and application abstractions.

- Conceptual package represent business domain knowledge and business rules, insofar as this information can be mined from existing applications. These packages are aligned with another OMG specification, called Semantics of Business Vocabulary and Business Rules (SBVR)
- Structure package describes the meta-model elements for representing the logical organization of the software system into subsystems, layers and components
- Build package represents the engineering view of the software system

== See also ==
- Object Management Group
- Software Metrics Metamodel is a metric specification that is based on the KDM
