= Mass migration =

Large-scale migration of people

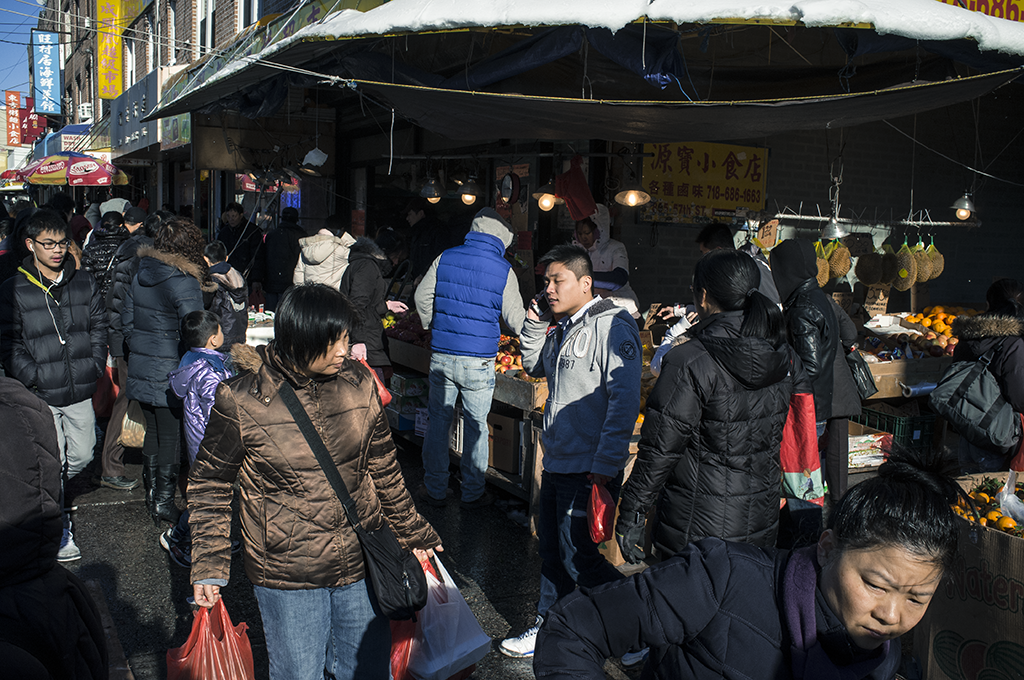
Typical grocery store on 8th Avenue in one of the Brooklyn Chinatowns (布鲁克林華埠) on Long Island, New York

Mass migration refers to the migration of large groups of people from one geographical area to another. Mass migration is distinguished from individual or small-scale migration; and also from seasonal migration, which may occur on a regular basis.

== History and examples of mass migrations ==
A specific mass migration that is seen as especially influential to the course of human cultural and anthropomorphic history may be referred to as a 'great migration'. For example, great migrations include the Indo-European migrations to Europe, the Middle East, and South Asia during the Bronze Age, the Bantu migrations across sub-Saharan Africa, Barbarian invasions during the Roman Empire, the Great Migration from England of the 1630s, the California Gold Rush from 1848–1850, the Great Migration of African Americans from the rural American South to the industrial north during 1920–1950, and The Great Oromo Migrations of Oromo tribes during the 15th and 16th centuries in the Horn of Africa. UNHCR estimates 14 million Hindus, Sikhs, and Muslims were displaced during the partition of India, the largest mass migration in human history.

The largest documented voluntary emigration in history was the Italian diaspora, which migrated from Italy between 1880 and 1915, with 13 million people leaving the country.

=== Forced migration ===
Mass migrations may be forced displacements, such as human trafficking, deportation or population cleansing.

=== Age of Mass Migration ===
Historians often identify an "age of mass migration" occurring from c. 1850 to 1914 (sometimes 1940), during which long-distance migration occurred at an unprecedented and exceptionally high rate.

There were three factors that led to the 'age of mass migration'. First, the cost of migration decreased dramatically. Second, the benefits of migration rose (the return on migration was higher in the United States than in other countries). Third, open border regimes encouraged migration. The 'age of mass migration' usually refers to the voluntary transatlantic migration of European peasants and laborers to the Americas.

Immigration from Europe accounted for about 40% of the total United States population growth in the late 19th century. It has been argued that the term should include other mass migrations that occurred in the same period since similarly, large numbers of people migrated long distances within the continent of Asia, most notably during the Pakistan Movement and the subsequent partition of India in 1947.

Immigrants were attracted by the falling costs of migration and higher wages in the United States. Depending on the relative wage premium in the U.S. for high and low-cost workers, as well as the relative cost of migration, the selection of migrants, varied over time and sending country. In the U.S. in the late 20th century, the number of migrants approximately equaled the number of native-born in the labor market.

The partition of India caused the movement of 18 million people. This caused both religious and civil tensions between Hindus and Muslims. This resulted in the highest casualty rate for one migration according to the Guinness Book of World Records 2014. One million people were killed and 12 million became homeless.

== See also ==
- Climate migration
- Great Migration (disambiguation)
- Gold rush
- Silver rush
- Transatlantic migrations
- Urbanization in China
