= FileNet =

American software company

FileNet Corporation
- Industry: Computer software
- Founded: 1982
- Fate: Acquired by IBM (2006)
- Number of locations: Costa Mesa, California, Paris, France and Wimbledon Village (later Stockley Park), England and Bad Homburg, Germany and Sydney, Australia.
- Key people: Lee Roberts, CEO; Ted Smith, Chairman and Founder
- Products: FileNet P8 Platform
- Website: www.ibm.com/software/ecm/filenet

FileNet Corporation was an American company that developed software to help enterprises manage their content and business processes. FileNet P8, their flagship offering, is a framework for developing custom enterprise systems, but it can be used as-is. It was acquired by IBM in 2006.

The company was based in Costa Mesa, California, and marketed Enterprise Content Management (ECM) and Business Process Management (BPM) services both directly and via a network of resellers, system integrators and application developers.

== History ==
=== 1980s ===
FileNet was founded in 1982 by Ted Smith, formerly of Basic 4, who saw the potential of the new 2.6GB laserdiscs (compared to then current 150 MB disk drives) to hold data required by scanned images. Paired with workflow software, this replaced paper-based methodology.

Smith's company designed and built their own 64 laserdisc jukebox (OSAR: Optical Storage and Retrieval), their own FileNet Distributed Operating System (FDOS), and their own servers, based on Motorola 68000 series processors with 8 to 32 MB of RAM.

The networking subsystem implemented the Xerox Network Standard (XNS) with Network Clearing House (NCH) as the directory service. The first systems shipped to beta customers in 1985 was FDOS version 1.6 with 1.8 released in 1986 and 2.2 in 1987. This included a limited workflow scripting system which was rewritten and expanded in the late 1980s for Windows.

=== 1990s ===
In the early 1990s, FileNet introduced a more "open" version of its WorkFlo Business System software, the Series 6500, that ran on the IBM RS/6000 AIX system. The networking software utilized TCP/IP but used FileNet's proprietary application protocols. A special port of the software to System V, Release 4 for the Intel 80486 multi-CPU Olivetti LSX5000 platform was developed. FileNet also adapted to the PC as a client platform with its WorkForce Desktop software, replacing its old workstation line.

==== Acquisitions ====
FileNet acquired

- Saros Corporation in 1995 for their electronic document management
- Watermark Software, a document imaging solution, Watermark Enterprise and Ensemble, and a Windows-based COLD product called Greenbar. The Watermark products became unsupported in 1999.
- Shana, a Canadian software company based in Edmonton producing an eForms solution.

FileNet pioneered with an "Integrated Document Management" suite offering document imaging, electronic document management, COLD and workflow. They concurrently delivered an internally developed entry-level system called Workgroup.

In the mid-1990s, FileNet's WorkFlow Business System evolved into Visual WorkFlo, which included a graphical user interface.

==== Panagon ====
FileNet rebranded as the Panagon software suite in 1998, and included:

- Panagon Image Services (high-end imaging tool formerly known as IMS)
- Panagon Content Services (EDM service, previously known as Saros Mezzanine)
- Panagon Report Manager (COLD service formerly known as Greenbar)
- Panagon Desktop (new client interface created for the Panagon Suite)
- Panagon Web Services (new web interface with a common code base with Panagon Desktop; replaced Saros @Mezzanine)
- Panagon eProcess (Workflow Automation Service built on top the Visual WorkFlo engine)

=== 2000s ===
In January 2001 FileNet released Acenza as an entrée into the applications marketplace, which was poorly received and later rebranded as FileNet Case Manager for Image Management (CMIM).

==== Development ====
In January 2002 FileNet announced BrightSpire, an application that was eventually rebranded as FileNet P8 ECM. There are a number of FileNet P8 ECM suites that leveraged the experience gained from integrated document management, web content management, and workflow into an integrated Enterprise Content Management (ECM) platform.

In April 2002, FileNet acquired eGrail Corporation, a company based in Bethesda, MD, to add Web Content Management (WCM).

In April 2003, FileNet added eForms capabilities to the Panagon and P8 products with the acquisition of long time form software vendor Shana Corporation of Edmonton, Canada.

Also in 2003, FileNet extended the P8 suite extending compliance capabilities with the P8 Records Manager tool which helps companies solve regulatory compliance and records issues.

In 2004 FileNet added Team Collaboration Manager, built on the P8 platform it is an out-of-the box application that helps organizations to be more agile and competitive by allowing virtual team members to work together across functional and geographical areas.

Late in 2005, FileNet acquired Yaletown Technology Group of Canada, formerly a FileNet ValueNet Partner; this allowed them to further their capabilities in managing different types of content in the FileNet P8 ECM platform with the Email Manager product (which they had been exclusively marketing in an OEM agreement and was formerly sold as eCW) and furthered their reach into compliance with Records Crawler, formerly known as Universal File Importer or UFI.

They also extended their Business Process Management capabilities releasing the Business Activity Monitor (BAM) application, which provided real-time event management and visibility of business performance data to enhance operational responsiveness and decision making.

IBM acquired FileNet in 2006; by early 2008, an iPhone version of the P8 client was available.

== P8 Versions and Editions ==
Version	Release date	Ownership
3.5.x	Dec 21, 2005	FileNet
4.0.x	Mar 15, 2007	IBM
4.5.x	Dec 12, 2008	IBM
5.0.x	Dec 16, 2010	IBM
5.1.x	Aug 26, 2011	IBM
5.2.0	Apr 12, 2013	IBM
5.2.1	Oct 28, 2014	IBM
5.5.0	Dec 7, 2017	IBM
5.5.1	Jun 28, 2018	IBM
5.5.2	Dec 13, 2018	IBM
5.5.3	June 1, 2019	IBM
5.5.4	Dec 10, 2019	IBM
5.5.5	June 6, 2020	IBM
