= Wienux =

WIENUX
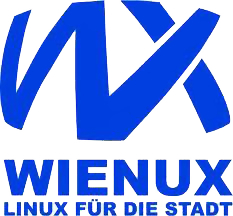

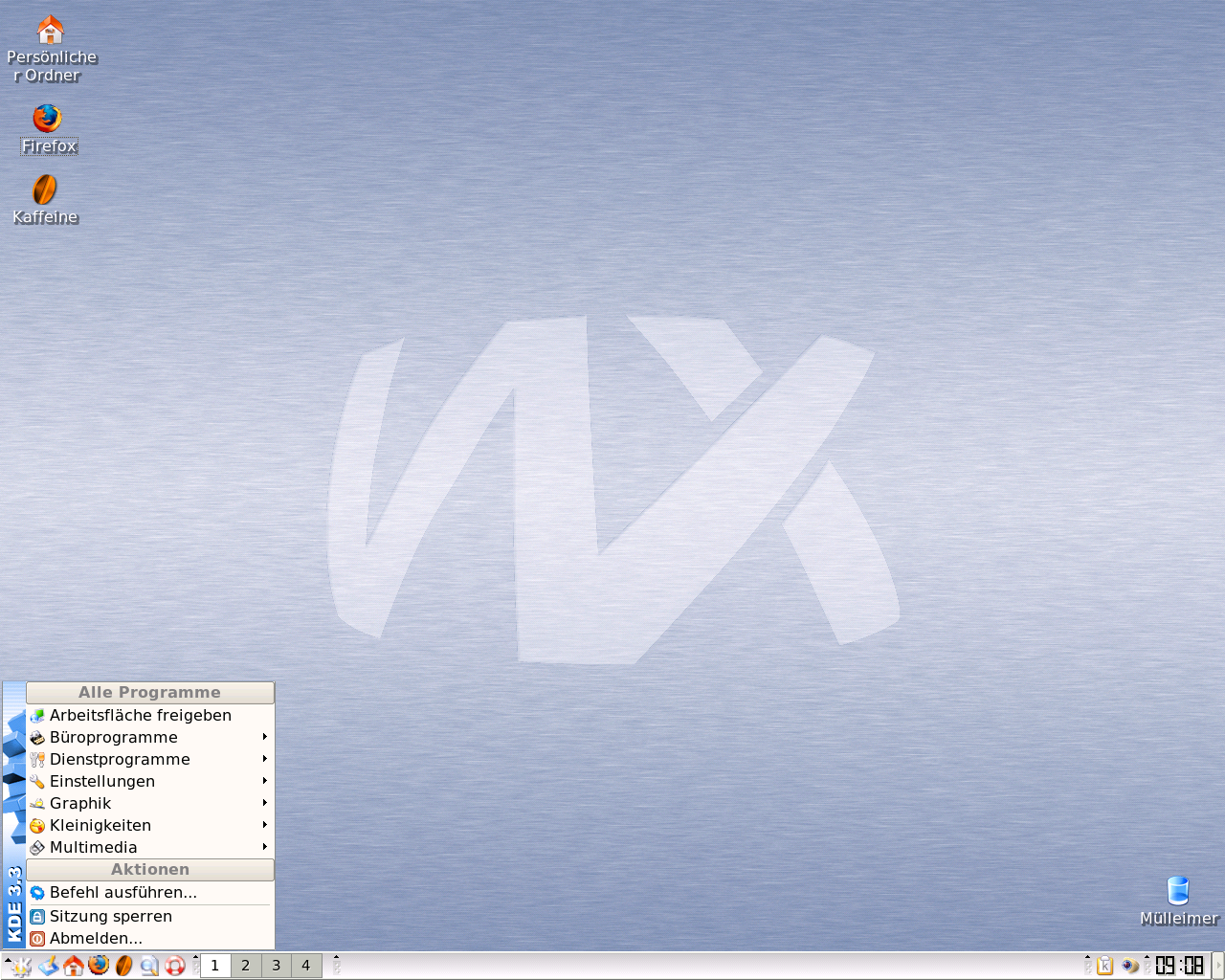
- WIENUX with KDE
- Developer: Wienux Project
- OS family: Linux (Unix-like)
- Working state: Abandoned
- Source model: Open source
- Package manager: dpkg
- Kernel type: Monolithic (Linux)
- Default user interface: KDE
- Official website: www.wien.gv.at/ma14/wienux.html

WIENUX is a Debian-based Linux distribution developed by the City of Vienna in Austria. Its main purpose is to replace proprietary operating systems and applications on the municipality's thousands of desktop computers with free and open source alternatives based on KDE, OpenOffice.org and Firefox. WIENUX was released in 2005 under the General Public License and was available for free download from the distribution's web site until 2008 when the download page was taken offline. In 2009 the migration to Linux as operating system was stopped and most desktop computers were equipped with a Windows operating system again.

== See also ==
- Canaima (operating system)
- GendBuntu
- Inspur
- LiMux
- Nova (operating system)
- Ubuntu Kylin
- VIT, C.A.
