= ADM (Amsterdam) =

Evicted squat in west Amsterdam

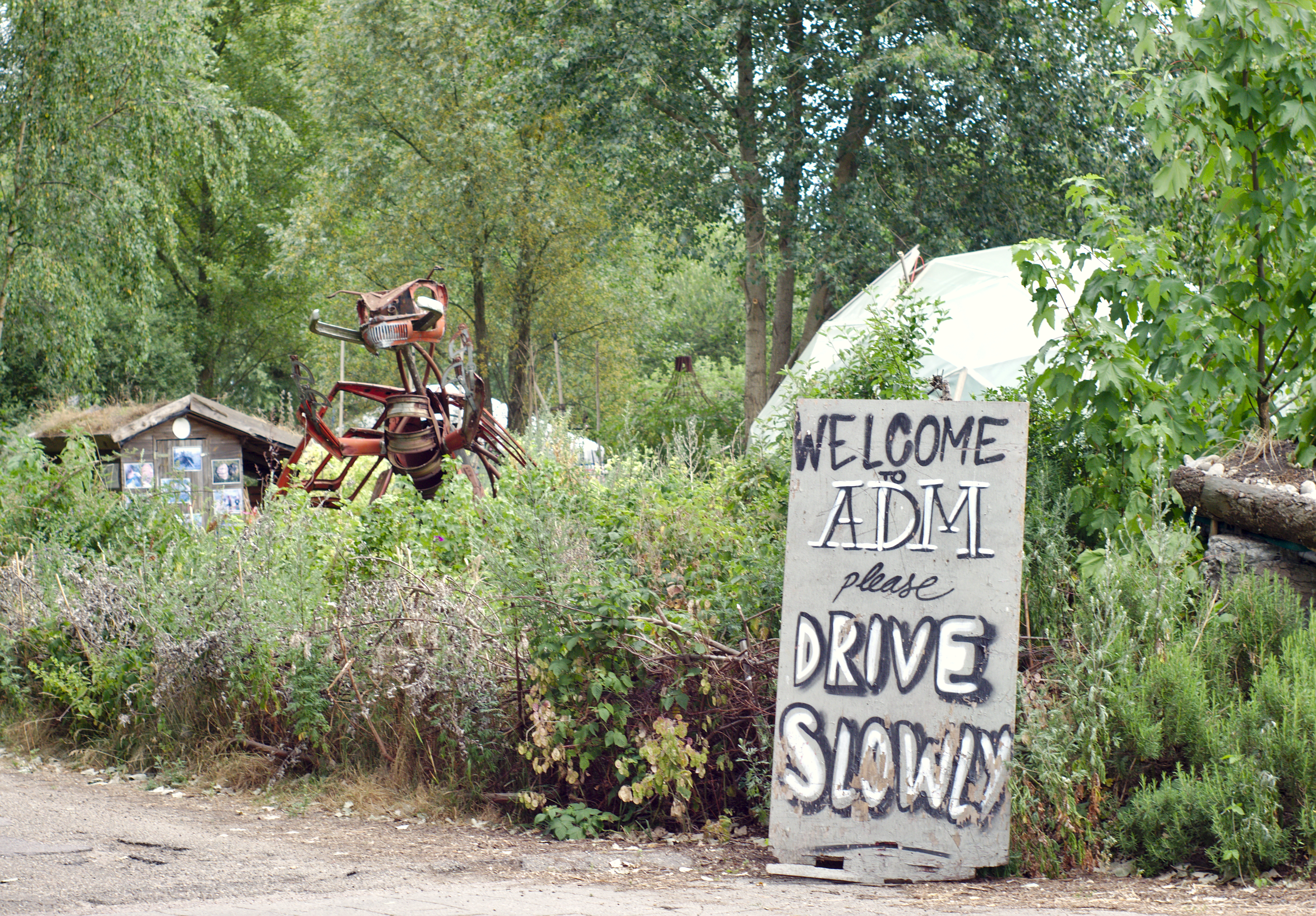
- Entrance to ADM
- Interactive map of the ADM area
- Alternative names: Amsterdamsche Droogdok Maatschappij

General information
- Status: music venue, social centre, squat
- Location: Hornweg 6, Amsterdam, Netherlands
- Coordinates: 52.4180°N 4.7961°E
- Opened: 1997
- Closed: 2019
- Demolished: 2019

Website
- adm.amsterdam

ADM was a squat in the Port of Amsterdam, to the west of the city next to the North Sea Canal. The squat lasted from 1997 until its eviction in early 2019. Around 130 people lived on the terrain of 45 hectares in buildings, on boats and in vehicles.

== History ==
ADM (de Amsterdamsche Droogdok Maatschappij) was the name of the Amsterdam drydock company which had previously occupied the site before going bankrupt in 1985.

The ADM terrain was first squatted in the mid 1980s and amongst other things was used as a music studio (ADM's Koeienverhuur). It was evicted in early 1993 since the owner allegedly had urgent plans for the terrain. The ownership was then transferred several times before ending up with Chidda Vastgoed BV and Amstelimmo BV, two companies owned by Bertus Lūske, the notorious speculator, who paid 27 million guilders for the parcel.

== Occupation ==
Since by 1997 nothing at all was happening on the terrain, it was resquatted by a group of 100 people, some of whom had lived there already. The date of the resquat was October 12, 1997.

On January 21, 1998, thugs hired by Lūske (the owner) came to the terrain and threatened people. They returned on March 3, banging on windows with iron bars. They then came back a third time on April 25, in the very early morning and began to demolish the building with an excavator machine. The confrontation was filmed. In a stroke of good fortune, none of the people sleeping in the building were harmed. The police were called and eventually defused the situation. In 1999, a court gave Lūske 240 hours of community service for attempted manslaughter and he was ordered to pay 1000 guilders to four ADM residents in damages.

Lūske was eventually assassinated in 2003 by unknown associates in the Amsterdam criminal underworld. He was shot outside a restaurant in front of his family.

== Activities ==
As well as being a place for people to live and work, ADM acted as an infoshop and social centre organising many events. To take September 2013 as an example, there was a barnight every Sunday, games and a freeshop every Wednesday, three concerts, a cabaret evening and a DIY festival with bands, stalls and a free market.

The ADM festival celebrated the anniversary of the occupation every year in mid October.

In August 1998, the squatters organised a large festival called Drydock which later developed into Robodock, a festival of alternative arts and culture which was to occur annually for a number of years. Tragically, a young Italian DJ (Antonio) was killed on the opening night of Drydock when someone drove a truck at full speed through wooden doors into the performance space. After tense negotiations with the police and Antonio's friends, it was decided to continue the party.

When the mains electricity cable to ADM was cut in 2007 and therefore the residents had to acquire a generator to provide power, which was used for several years before the mains connection was reinstituted, this led to a ‘Generator Madness’ festival in 2007, at which the ADM symbol was first seen (a detourned version of the electricity company logo).

By the 2010s, ADM defined itself as a ‘cultural freehaven’ and had become a place known far beyond the Netherlands.

Local Amsterdam television station AT5 produced a six part series on ADM called the Lost Free State (De Verloren Vrijstaat) in 2018, which can be watched as one long segment on vimeo.

== Eviction ==
In 2015, ADM again came under threat of eviction. This resulted in an extremely complex situation with numerous courtcases (over 20). The three main parties in the dispute were the owner (still Chidda Vastgoed BV and Amstelimmo BV), the city council and the ADM squatters. The argument of the owner was that they wanted to rent the terrain to Koole Maritime BV, but the plans of Koole were repeatedly found to be inadequate in court.

Also involved were groups such as the National Authority for Business (Rijksdienst voor Ondernemers), the people living in caravans outside the ADM terrain, local political parties and so on. ADM won some of the courtcases. A petition in support of ADM which asked the Mayor to intervene in order to preserve the cultural freehaven was signed by over 20,000 people.

Ultimately after several years, the final juridical decision was that the 130 ADM residents needed to leave ADM before December 25, 2018. An alternative site was offered by the Amsterdam Council for a two-year period with limited space and no possibility to moor boats. It became known as the sludge fields.

About 50 of the residents did not leave, resulting in a largescale unannounced eviction on January 7, 2019. That evening, a noise demonstration was held for the 11 arrestees.

On January 20, 2019, ex-residents of ADM and supporters slept outside at the Dam Square to protest the eviction.

== See also ==
- Ruigoord
- OCCII
- OT301
- Vrankrijk
