= Operational responsiveness =

Concept in strategic management

Operational responsiveness is a quality of a business process or supporting IT solution, which indicates its ability to respond to changing conditions and customer interactions as they occur.

An operationally responsive business process or IT solution is one that reacts quickly and effectively to a wide range of business events as they occur, and is also one that is managed in such a way as to be rapidly and effectively evolved in response to changes in the business environment itself so as to drive both consistency and value of business outcomes.

The key difference between operational responsiveness and related concepts like process optimization and agility is the implied continuous improvement of business results, as opposed to merely continuous improvement of process metrics or the cost of implementing changes.

Improving operational responsiveness requires significant changes in either the elements linked together in a functional system, the linkages between subsystems, or both. This is true whether the system is organizational, technology-based, and so on.

To meet these objectives, the business owner of the process or solution must regularly assess its activities and business performance and then execute well-informed decisions regarding adjustments to its operation. An operationally responsive process or solution must directly support these assessment activities by providing relevant information to feed the decision-making process.

Operational responsiveness can also be applied to organizations. An operationally responsive organization is one that is consistently effective in making appropriate and timely decisions - about individual customer requests, about short term fluctuations in operating conditions, about changes in the overall business environment - and then executing on those decisions. This means not only reacting quickly, but routinely applying all of the relevant available information to make the best possible decisions.

== Qualitative attributes of operationally responsive business solutions ==
- Operates reliably and security. Each request is protected against loss or delay. Unauthorized access and control is prevented.
- Uses situation awareness. Information about each business action and the relevant business environment is used to help the system respond to complex business situations correctly.
- Includes monitoring and support. Sufficient instrumentation and monitoring is included so problems can be identified and corrected quickly.
- Provides information used to inform business decisions. Solutions must capture enough relevant information to provide the business with a complete picture for ongoing monitoring and analysis, and to support business decisions about individual activities and future evolution of the business process.

== Related contexts ==
The term has been used in several other areas.

Operational responsiveness has been used in a military context to describe both the ability of a military unit or operation to respond quickly and effectively to changes in the local situation as they occur, and the ability for the central leadership to quickly provide information, resources, or new capabilities to the field, typically in response to expressed needs of local commanders.

The key concepts of operational responsiveness have emerged as critical to supply chain management as the practice has evolved. The operational dimension of supply chain management (the other dimensions are strategic and tactical) is focused on daily production and distribution planning, and being responsive to fluctuations in production and demand is a fundamental objective. The other aspects of operational responsiveness are apparent in the strategic and tactical activities as well, where longer-term plans are adjusted according to an evaluation of current and anticipated changes in the overall business environment.

== Operational responsiveness articles ==
- "The Operational Responsiveness of Business"
- "Operational Responsiveness: Ideas from Progress Software"
- "Enterprise Architecture in a Down Economy"
- "Independent Research Firm Names Progress Apama as Standout in CEP Report"
