= PC Conectado =

PC Conectado, or Computador para Todos, is a tax-free computer initiative launched by the Brazilian government, since 2003.

PCs available through the project are relatively low-end, but therefore are cheap enough to satisfy most of the population, at R$ 1200 (or about US$ 500). Most PCs available have:

- 128 or 256 MB RAM
- A low end processor, usually a Celeron processor.
- 40 or 80 GB hard disk
- Linux, usually Insigne Linux, a Fedora based distribution fully compatible with software repositories.

In the initial phases of the project, Microsoft offered the Brazilian government the use of its Windows XP Starter Edition, a cut down version of their popular OS for developing countries. The offer was rejected due to the severe limitations of the Starter Edition. Since then, the project has used only free and open source software for general work, like Inkscape, OpenOffice, GIMP and Amarok.

The Brazilian government's decision to reject Microsoft's proprietary and limited (i.e. cut-down) version of MS Windows XP in favor of a full featured and free Linux operating system was widely reported in the US media and IT periodicals. This decision could be interpreted as a severe, humiliating and embarrassing rejection for Microsoft. The president of the Brazilian agency in charge of the governments technology initiatives, Sérgio Amadeu, unequivocally stated that he was against spending Brazilian tax-payers money on furthering Microsoft's monopoly:

We're not going to spend taxpayers' money on a program so that Microsoft can further consolidate its monopoly. It's the government's responsibility to ensure that there is competition, and that means giving alternative software platforms a chance to prosper.

An option providing cheap dial-up access to the Internet may be available soon, costing R$7 (about US$2.50). Also, a project to offer a popular broadband internet access (512 kbit/s), charging a monthly fee between 15 and 35 reais (between 8.5 and 20 US dollars).

== Availability ==
PC Conectado can be acquired in many major Brazilian department stores. Many Brazilian stores have an independent Linux vendor on site from whom a user can choose the hardware configuration and distro.

== See also ==
- FIC Conectado
- $100 laptop
