= LliureX =

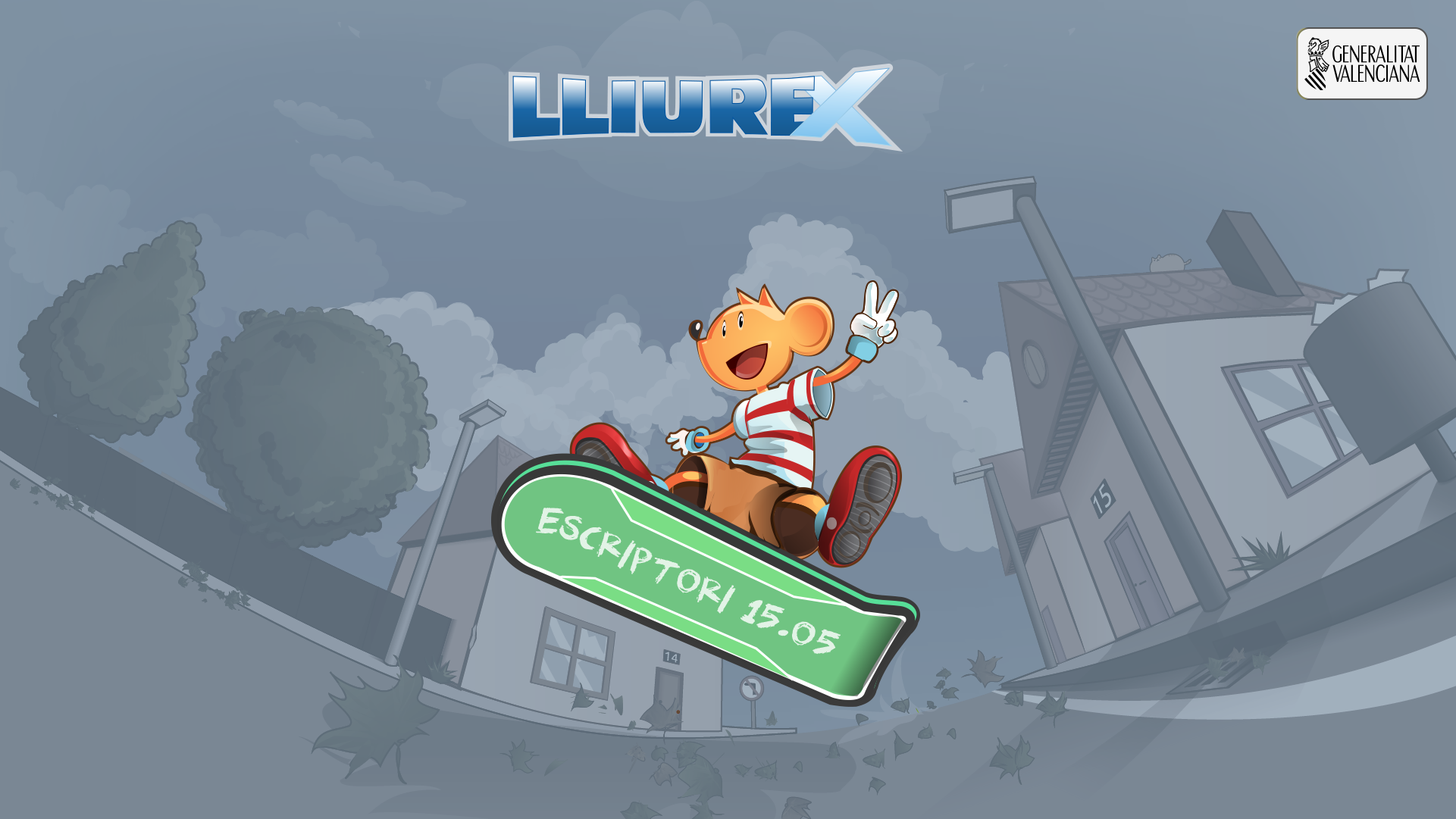
- LliureX screenshot
- OS family: Linux (Unix-like)
- Working state: Current
- Source model: Open source
- Supported platforms: x86
- Kernel type: Monolithic
- Userland: GNU, Ubuntu long-term support base
- Default user interface: KDE Plasma 5
- License: various
- Official website: portal.edu.gva.es/lliurex

LliureX (Valencian pronunciation: [ˈʎiwɾeks]) is a project of the Generalitat Valenciana with the goal of introducing new ICTs based on free software in the Valencian Community education system.

It is a Linux distribution that is used on over 110,000 PCs in schools in the Valencia region.

Originally it was based on Debian but since version 7.09 it is based on Ubuntu and since version 19 on KDE neon.

== Awards ==
LliureX was awarded the Open Awards 2019 at the OpenExpo conference for its innovation in the field of education.
