= Great Migration =

Great Migration, Great Migrations, or The Great Migration may refer to:

== Historical events ==
- The Migration Period of Europe from 400 to 800 AD
- Great Migration of Puritans from England to New England (1620–1643)
- Great Migrations of the Serbs from the Ottoman Empire to the Habsburg Monarchy (1690 and 1737)
- Great Migration of Canada, increased migration to Canada (approximately 1815–1850)
- Great Migration, resulting from the 1947 Partition of British India
- African American "Great Migrations":
  - The original Great Migration (African American) from the southern United States to the northern United States (c. 1910–1930), sometimes called the Great Northward Migration
  - The Second Great Migration (African American) from the southern United States to the northern and western United States (1941–1970)
  - The New Great Migration, reverse migration from the North, Midwest and the West to the southern United States (1965–present)
- The Great Migration of 1843, the first large group of settlers to travel via the Oregon Trail to the Oregon Country
- The Great Trek of South African Boers away from British colonial power
- Great Emigration of Poles
- The Great Migration or Great Fleet, the traditional Māori recount of their arrival in New Zealand

== Nature ==
- Great migration, the continuous year-long clockwise mass migration of wildlife from the Ngorongoro to Serengeti in Tanzania to Masai Mara in Kenya, and back

== Arts and media ==
- Great Migrations, 2010 National Geographic nature documentary television miniseries
- The Great Migration (album), 2006 album by rapper Bronze Nazareth
- Great Migrations (Greyhawk), fictional migrations in Dungeons & Dragons: World of Greyhawk

== See also ==
- Mass migration
- Forced migration
- Human migration
- Great Upheaval
- Early human migrations
- Pre-modern human migration
- Indo-European migrations
- Great American Interchange
