= Major events in computer science in China =

The following presents a list of the most significant events in the field of computer science in China since the founding of the People's Republic of China, arranged chronologically.

== Chronology ==
Chronology of Major Events in Computer Science of the People's Republic of China
Time	Event	Research and development unit
1956	The Institute of Computing Technology of the Chinese Academy of Sciences was established, headed by Hua Luogeng.	
1956	Xia Peisu designed the arithmetic unit and control unit of China's first electronic computer, and also wrote China's first lecture notes on the principles of electronic computers.	
1957	Harbin Institute of Technology successfully developed China's first structured simulation computer.	
1958	China's first computer, the 103 machine (also known as the DJS-1 computer), was successfully developed. It had a processing speed of 1500 operations per second, and was able to run short programs.	It was jointly developed by the Institute of Computing Technology of the Chinese Academy of Sciences and the Beijing Cable Factory.
1959	The Institute of Computing Technology, Chinese Academy of Sciences, successfully developed the 104 computer (i.e., the DJS-2 computer), capable of 10,000 operations per second. The scientific calculations related to the development of China's first atomic bomb were performed on the 104 machine.	Institute of Computing Technology, Chinese Academy of Sciences
1960	In April, the research team led by Xia Peisu completed the development of the 107, a general-purpose mini electronic digital computer.	Institute of Computing Technology, Chinese Academy of Sciences
1963	The successful development of China's first large-scale transistor electronic computer, the Type 109, marked the beginning of the second generation of China's electronic computer technology. It utilized over 20,000 transistors and over 30,000 vacuum tubes.	Institute of Computing Technology, Chinese Academy of Sciences
1964	The first self-designed large-scale general-purpose digital vacuum tube computer, Machine 119, was developed, which later fulfilled the calculation tasks for the development of China's first hydrogen bomb.	Institute of Computing Technology, Chinese Academy of Sciences
1964	The 441B all-transistor computer was successfully developed under the leadership of Ci Yungui at the Military Engineering Academy of the Chinese People's Liberation Army in Harbin. The successful development of this machine laid the foundation for this institution to become the driving force behind the later supercomputer series "Galaxy" and "Tianhe".	National University of Defense Technology, Changsha (formerly the Military Engineering Academy of the Chinese People's Liberation Army)
1965	China’s first large-scale general-purpose transistor digital computer, the 109B, passed national appraisal.	Institute of Computing Technology, Chinese Academy of Sciences
1967	The 109C large-scale transistor computer was successfully developed. It then served the defense sector for 15 years, accumulating over 100,000 hours of effective computation.	The Institute of Computing Technology, Chinese Academy of Sciences,
1970	The Harbin Military Engineering Academy of the Chinese People's Liberation Army successfully developed China's first computer with a multiprogramming time-sharing operating system and standard assembly language, the 441B-III model; it was a fully transistorized computer.	Changsha National University of Defense Technology (formerly the Military Engineering Academy of the Chinese People's Liberation Army)
1972	The East China Institute of Computing Technology in Shanghai developed a large-scale integrated circuit general-purpose digital electronic computer capable of performing 110,000 operations per second.	Shanghai East China Institute of Computing Technology
1973	In January, the Fourth Ministry of Machine Building convened the "First Professional Conference on Electronic Computers" (also known as the 7301 Conference) in Beijing, which established the policy of developing a series of computers and proposed the task of jointly developing three series of computers: small, medium and large, with a focus on small and medium-sized computers, and efforts to popularize and apply them.	
1973	China's first million-operation-times integrated circuit electronic computer, the 150, was successfully developed.	Peking University, Beijing Cable Television Plant, and the Ministry of Fuel and Chemical Industry, among other units...
1974	China's first serialized small integrated circuit computers, the DJS-130, 131, 132, 135, 140, 152, and 153, etc, was successfully developed, with software compatible with the American DG NOVA series.	Tsinghua University, East China Normal University, and other institutions...
1976	The DJS-183, 184, 185, 186, 1804 large-scale general-purpose integrated circuit electronic computers were successfully developed, with software compatible with the DEC PDP-11 series from the United States.	North China Computing Institute and the state-owned Nanfeng Machinery Factory.
1977	China's first microcomputer, the DJS-050, passed evaluation.	
1977	The development of the Galaxy supercomputer was initially led by Ci Yungui, and formally started in 1978.	Changsha National University of Defense Technology (formerly the Military Engineering Academy of the Chinese People's Liberation Army)
1979	The East China Institute of Computing Technology developed the HDS-9 integrated circuit computer, capable of performing 5 million operations per second.	East China Institute of Computing Technology
1979	Professor Wang Xuan used China's first laser typeset machine to produce sample books.	
1981	GB2312 national standard "Chinese Character Set (Basic Set) for Information Processing and Interchange" was promulgated and implemented.	
1983	The Great Wall 100 DJS-0520 microcomputer (compatible with IBM PCs) passed ministerial-level evaluation.	Sixth Research Institute of the Ministry of Electronics Industry
1983	Wubi method for Chinese character input passes evaluation	
1983	The "Galaxy-1" supercomputer, which had a computing speed of 100 million operations per second, was developed. It made China the third country, after the United States and Japan, to be able to independently design and manufacture supercomputers.	The National University of Defense Technology
1984	The New Technology Development Company was established, which was the predecessor of Lenovo Group.	
1985	Huaguang Type II (Chinese: 华光Ⅱ型) Chinese Character Laser Typesetting System was put into Operation.	
1985	The Great Wall 0520CH was launched	China Great Wall Computer Group Corporation (formerly China Computer Development Corporation)
1986	The CEC-1 learning machine entered production.	Tsinghua University led the joint design, with participation from the Sixth Research Institute of the Ministry of Electronics Industry, State-owned Factory 734 (Nanjing Cable Factory), Shaanxi Provincial Computer Factory, and Huaming Computer Co., Ltd.
1987	the Great Wall 286 PC was launched.	
1987	China achieved its first computer network connection with foreign countries, and the Beijing Institute of Computer Application Technology sent China's first email to the University of Karlsruhe in West Germany.	
1988	Great Wall 386 Launched	China Great Wall Computer Group Corporation (formerly China Computer Development Corporation)
1988	China's first workstation series, the Huasheng 3000 series, was successfully developed.	Sixth Research Institute of the Ministry of Electronics Industry and other units
1988	First case of computer virus discovered	
1990	China's first highly intelligent computer—the EST/IS4260 intelligent workstation—was born.	
1990	The Great Wall 486 computer was born.	
1992	The National University of Defense Technology in Changsha developed the Galaxy-II general-purpose parallel computer.	National University of Defense Technology in Changsha (formerly the Military Engineering Academy of the Chinese People's Liberation Army)
1993	The Dawning-1 fully symmetric shared-memory multiprocessor computer was successfully developed.	National Research and Development Center for Intelligent Computers
1994	In July, the China Education and Research Network (CERNET) adopted IP/x.25 technology to connect five cities including Beijing, Shanghai, Guangzhou, Nanjing and Xi'an, and was interconnected with the Internet through the international exit of NCFC, becoming a computer network running the TCP/IP protocol.	
1995	Dawning Corporation launched the Dawning 1000, which included 36 processors, achieving a peak speed of 2.5 billion floating-point operations per second and an actual processing speed of 1 billion floating-point operations per second.	Sugon Information Industry Co., Ltd.
1996	Lenovo computers rank first in sales volume in the China PC market.	
1997	The National University of Defense Technology in Changsha developed the Galaxy III, which had a peak performance of 13 billion floating-point operations per second.	
1997	In October, China Public Computer Internet (CHINANET) was interconnected with China Science and Technology Network (CSTNET), China Education and Research Network (CERNET), and China Golden Bridge Network (CHINAGBN).	
1999	The National University of Defense Technology in Changsha developed the Galaxy IV supercomputer, which consisted of 1,024 CPUs and achieved a peak performance of 1.0647 trillion floating-point operations per second. All of its indicators reached the international advanced level at that time.	
2000	GB18030 Coding Standard was released	
2000	China successfully developed its own high-performance computer, "Sunway I," and became the third country in the world, after the United States and Japan, to possess the capability to develop high-performance computers.	
2001	The Institute of Computing Technology of the Chinese Academy of Sciences started developing a high-performance general-purpose CPU chip with independent intellectual property rights, which they named "Loongson".	
2002	In August, the development of "Loongson 1" was completed, and it was officially launched on September 28. In December of the same year, the "Loongson Alliance" was officially established, jointly initiated by seven Chinese companies including the Institute of Computing Technology of the Chinese Academy of Sciences, Haier Group, Great Wall Group Changruan Company, China Software Corporation, Red Flag Software, Dawning Group, and Shenzhou Loongson.	
2004	On December 23, the IPv6 address of the .CN server, China's national top-level domain, logged into the global root domain name server.	
2005	Loongson 2 officially launched	
2006	The Hanxin fraud and the halt of the development of the "Ark 3" chip have dealt a blow to China's chip manufacturing industry.	Shanghai Jiaotong University Hanxin Technology Co., Ltd. and Ark Technology (Beijing) Co., Ltd.
2009	“The Tianhe-1 supercomputer was born, making China the second country in the world, after the United States, capable of developing petaflop supercomputers.	
2013	The Tianhe-2 supercomputer was put into operation at the National Supercomputing Center in Guangzhou.	
2016	The "Sunway TaihuLight," powered by domestically manufactured Chinese chips, replaced "Tianhe-2" to top the list of the world's top 500 supercomputers.	
2021	The Sunway Ocean Light was developed, an exascale supercomputer.	Laoshan Laboratory (Qingdao Guoshi) Supercomputing Center

== See also ==
- Supercomputing in China
- Internet in China
- Computer science
