= Xia Peisu =

Chinese computer scientist

- 夏培肃
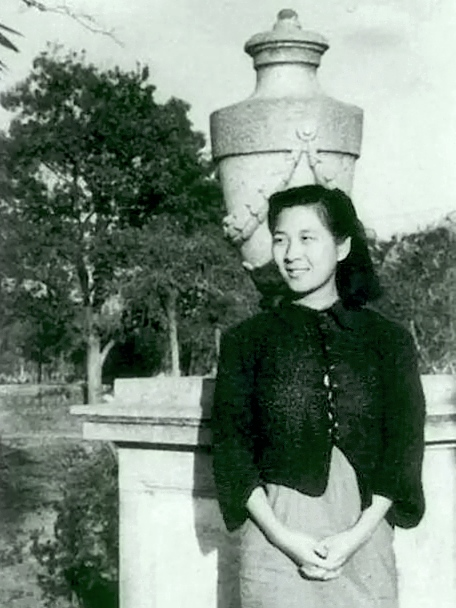
- Xia Peisu at Chongqing Jiaotong University, 1946
- Born: 28 July 1923; Chongqing, China
- Died: 27 August 2014 (aged 91); Beijing, China
- Other name: Pei-su Hsia
- Education: National Central University; University of Edinburgh
- Occupations: Computer scientist and educator
- Spouse: Yang Liming (m. 1950; died 2003)

Xia Peisu or Pei-su Hsia (Chinese: 夏培肃; 28 July 1923 – 27 August 2014) was a Chinese computer scientist and educator known for her pioneering research in computer science and technology. The leading developer of Model 107, the nation's first domestically designed general-purpose electronic computer, she has been called the "Mother of Computer Science in China". She and her husband Yang Liming were both elected academicians of the Chinese Academy of Sciences in 1991. In 2010, she was honoured with the inaugural Lifetime Achievement Award from the China Computer Federation.

Since 2015, the China Computer Federation in memory of academician Xia, the predecessor of computer science in China, awards the Xia-Piesu Award annually to female scientists and engineers recognised for their "outstanding contributions and achievements in the computer science, engineering, education and industry."

== Early life and education ==
Xia was born on 28 July 1923 in Chongqing, Sichuan, to a literary family. Her grandfather, Xia Fengxun (夏风薰), who had passed the imperial examination for the xiucai degree during the late Qing dynasty, spent forty years as a teacher. Her father, Xia Hongru (夏鸿儒), who had passed the provincial imperial examination for the juren degree, ran a school in Jiangjin County, Chongqing. Her mother, Huang Xiaoyong (黄孝永), was a teacher at the Jiangjin Girls' Middle School and headmistress of Jiangjin Girls' Primary School.

Under the private tutelage of her family, Xia built a solid foundation in ancient Chinese prose and mathematics at a young age. At fourteen years old, Xia was accepted into Nanyu Secondary School (now Chongqing Nankai Secondary School), where she consistently placed at the top of her class and excelled in mathematics. In 1939, during the Second Sino-Japanese War, Xia was forced to transfer to the National No. Nine Middle School in Jiangjin County. She graduated high school in 1940 at the top of her class and began her undergraduate degree in electrical engineering at the National Central University the same year.

After attaining her bachelor's degree, Xia pursued postgraduate studies at the Telecommunications Research Institute of National Chiao Tung University (Chongqing) from 1945 to 1947. In 1947, Xia began a PhD in electrical engineering at the University of Edinburgh in the United Kingdom, where she earned her doctorate with a thesis entitled "On Parametric Oscillations in Electronic Circuits. (II) A Graphical Analysis for Non-Linear Systems" in 1950.

== Career ==
Two years after the founding of the People's Republic of China, Xia and her husband Yang Liming returned to China in 1951. She took up an appointment as an associate researcher in the Department of Electrical Engineering at Tsinghua University.

In the fall of 1952, mathematician Hua Luogeng initiated the development of China's first electronic computer, and recruited Xia and two other scientists to lead the project at the Chinese Academy of Sciences (CAS). This became the turning point in her career. Four years later, she became a founding professor of the Institute of Computing Technology of the CAS, where she spent the remainder of her career. After the two other scientists, Min Naida and Wang Chuanying, both left the project, Xia led the development of China's first indigenously designed general-purpose electronic computer, Model 107, which became operational in 1960. She has been acclaimed as the "Mother of Computer Science in China".

Xia made numerous contributions to the research and design of high-speed computers in China. She is also credited with designing a high-speed array processor and a range of multiple parallel computers. She helped establish the Chinese Journal of Computers in 1978 and the Journal of Computer Science and Technology, the only English-language journal in the computer field published in China, in 1986.

In March 1956, Xia taught China's first course in computer theory, and wrote Principles of the Electronic Computer, the first systematic computer science textbook in China. When the University of Science and Technology of China was founded in 1958, Xia was in charge of establishing its computer science department. She taught more than 700 students from 1956 to 1962.

Xia advised more than 60 graduate students, two of whom won top national prizes for Ph.D. dissertations. Her students included Li Guojie, who led the development of the Sugon supercomputers; and Hu Weiwu, the chief architect of the Loongson CPU. When Loongson unveiled China's first indigenously designed CPU in 2002, Hu named it Xia-50 to celebrate her five-decade-long career in computer science.

In 1991, Xia Peisu and her husband Yang Liming were both elected as academicians of the Chinese Academy of Sciences. In recognition of her contributions to China's computer industry, the China Computer Federation honoured Xia with its inaugural Lifetime Achievement Award in 2010, along with Zhang Xiaoxiang.

== Personal life ==
In 1945, Xia met Yang Liming, an alumnus of National Central University. They married in 1950, when they were both studying at the University of Edinburgh. Yang later became a prominent theoretical physicist. The couple had two sons, Yang Yuenian and Yang Yuemin. The children followed the footsteps of their parents: Yuenian became a computer scientist, and Yuemin a physicist.

Xia died on 27 August 2014, aged 91.

== Works ==
- Hsia, Pei-Su (1950). I. On parametric oscillations in electronic circuits; and, II. A graphical analysis for non-linear systems (PhD thesis). University of Edinburgh. hdl:1842/34690.
