= Sun Ninghui =

Chinese computer scientist

- Born: March 1968 (age 58); Shanghai, China
- Education: Peking University
- Scientific career
- Fields: Computer science
- Workplaces: Institute of Computing Technology, Chinese Academy of Sciences

Chinese name
- Traditional Chinese: 孫凝暉
- Simplified Chinese: 孙凝晖
Transcriptions
Standard Mandarin
- Hanyu Pinyin: Sūn Nínghuī

Sun Ninghui (Chinese: 孙凝晖; born March 1968) is a Chinese computer scientist who is a researcher and the current director of the Institute of Computing Technology, Chinese Academy of Sciences.

== Biography ==
Sun was born in Shanghai, in March 1968, while his ancestral home in Shou County, Anhui. He secondary studied at Fanchang County No.1 High School. He earned the highest marks in his county during the 1985 National College Entrance Examination. He holds a bachelor's degree from Peking University, and obtained his master's and doctor's degrees from the Institute of Computing Technology, Chinese Academy of Sciences under the direction of Li Guojie (computer scientist). After graduation, he worked at the institute, where he was promoted to its director in 2011. He was a visiting scholar at Princeton University between June 1996 and June 1997. He has been director of the State Key Laboratory of Computer Architecture since October 2011.

== Honours and awards ==
- 1995 State Science and Technology Progress Award (Second Class)
- 1997 State Science and Technology Progress Award (First Class)
- 2001 State Science and Technology Progress Award (Second Class)
- 2003 State Science and Technology Progress Award (Second Class)
- 2006 State Science and Technology Progress Award (Second Class)
- 2009 National Science Fund for Distinguished Young Scholars
- 2013 State Science and Technology Progress Award (Second Class)
- November 22, 2019 Member of the Chinese Academy of Engineering (CAE)

Academic offices
Preceded by Li Guojie	Director of Institute of Computing Technology, Chinese Academy of Sciences; 2011	Incumbent
