= Li Guojie =

Li Guojie, may refer to:

- Li Guojie (computer scientist) (born 1943), Chinese computer scientist, member of the Chinese Academy of Engineering
- Li Guojie (fencer) (born 1985), Chinese épée fencer, who competed at the 2008 Summer Olympics and the 2012 Summer Olympics
