= Unity Operating System =

Chinese Linux distribution

Unity Operating System Unified Operating System

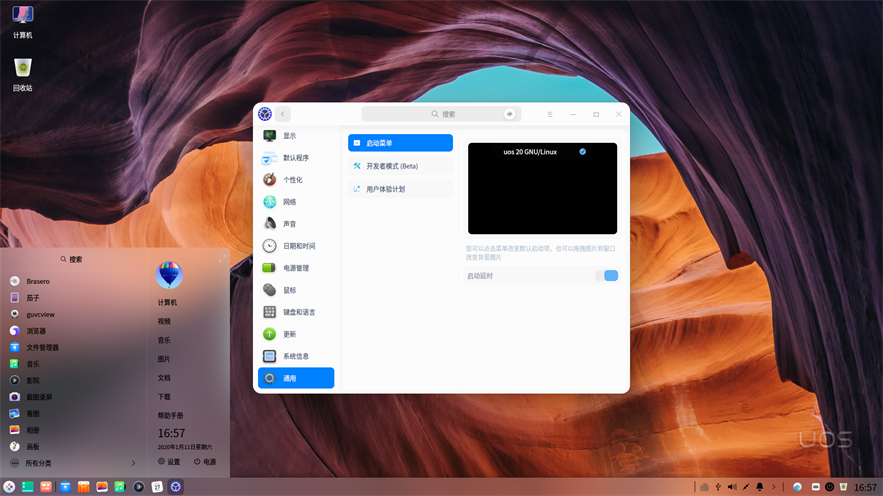
- UOS desktop screenshot
- Developer: UnionTech (Tongxin)
- OS family: Linux (Unix-like)
- Initial release: 14 January 2020; 6 years ago
- Marketing target: Desktop, Server
- Supported platforms: x86-64, Sunway, MIPS64, ARM64, LoongArch64
- Kernel type: Monolithic
- License: GNU
- Official website: www.chinauos.com

Unity Operating System (also known as Unified Operating System or UOS, Chinese: 统一操作系统) is a Linux distribution developed by UnionTech (Chinese: 统信软件, Tǒngxìn) based on Deepin, which is based on Debian. It is used in China as part of a government initiative beginning in 2019 to replace foreign-made software such as Microsoft Windows with domestic products.

== Development ==
Three versions are currently under development, a desktop for regular users (Deepin), another for enterprises (UOS) and a server version (UOS). A first beta version was released in December 2019 and can be downloaded from the official website. A first stable version was released on 14 January 2020.

== Support ==
The operating system is primarily aimed at the Chinese market and was intended to replace Microsoft Windows in the country by 2022, also known as the "3-5-2 policy", however Microsoft Windows is still heavily used in the country. So far, the focus has therefore been primarily on Chinese government-owned companies' hardware such as that from the semiconductor company Zhaoxin. The whole KX-6000 series is already supported by the desktop version as well as the KH-30000 series for server version.

Broad support is planned, so platforms such as LoongArch64, Sunway or ARM are also to be supported.

== See also ==
- Ubuntu Kylin
- Kylin OS
- Deepin
- Astra Linux – a similar project by the Russian government
- Canaima (operating system) – a similar project by the Venezuelan computer manufacturer VIT, C.A. and Chinese information technology company Inspur
- GendBuntu – a similar project used by Gendarmerie in France
- LiMux – a similar project of the city council of Munich
- Nova (operating system) – a similar project by the Cuban government
- Red Star OS – a similar project by the North Korean government
- Pardus (operating system)
- List of Debian-based Linux distributions
