= DDE =

DDE may refer to:

- D.D.E. (band), a Norwegian rock band
- Delay differential equation, a type of differential equation
- Deep-dose equivalent, a measure of radiation absorbed by the body
- Dichlorodiphenyldichloroethylene, a chemical that results from the breakdown of DDT
- Doctrine of double effect, a set of ethical criteria to evaluate the permissibility of acting when one's otherwise legitimate act may also cause an effect one would normally be obliged to avoid
- Dwight D. Eisenhower, the 34th president of the United States
- Dynamic Data Exchange, a Microsoft Windows and OS/2 inter-application data communication protocol
- Escort destroyer, a US Navy classification used between 1945 and 1962
- D.De., an abbreviation used for the United States District Court for the District of Delaware
- Deepin Desktop Environment, a Desktop Environment used by several Linux Distributions
