= Inspur Server Series =

Series of Chinese server computers

Inspur Server series
- Developer: Inspur Information; Inspur Systems
- Type: GPU Servers; Rack-mounted servers Open Computing Servers; Multi-node Servers
- Released: 1993 - Present

Inspur Server Series is a series of server computers introduced in 1993 by Inspur, an information technology company, and later expanded to the international markets. The servers were likely among the first originally manufactured by a Chinese company. It is currently developed by Inspur Information and its San Francisco-based subsidiary company - Inspur Systems, both Inspur's spinoff companies. The product line includes GPU Servers, Rack-mounted servers, Open Computing Servers and Multi-node Servers.

== Timeline of server production ==
- 1993, Inspur developed SMP2000, one of the first China-manufactured server based on 10 processors.
- 2000. The first production line was completed with an annual capacity of 100,000 servers.
- 2003. The annual production capacity increased to 300,000 units.
- 2010. The company released SR 1.0 rack scale server. Its technical features, including power supply and management have later become the ODCC standards.
- In May 2014, Inspur formally joined SPEC (Standard Performance Evaluation Corporation).
- 2017. Inspur launched the ultra-high density GPU supercomputer AGX-2, one of the first 2U 8GPUs servers with an enabled NVLink2.0. In 2017, the company's production ranked the 3rd place among the world's server manufactures both in shipment and revenues, behind Dell EMC and HPE, according to Gartner and other sources.
- 2018. Inspur server i48 and NF5486M5 were listed in the CRN top ten enterprise servers. The same year, the company produced a server with the world's highest storage density at the time of release.
- 2019. Inspur delivered a shipment of rack scale servers of more than 10,000 nodes to the Baidu data center in 8 hours, which set the industry's new record. The delivery and deployment model reached L11 (Rack Level Integration). The same year, it also released NE5260M5, the first edge computing server in line with ODCC Open Telecom IT standards. It also released and open-sourced NF8260M5 code named “Crane Mountain”, the industry's first high-density 4-socket server, to the OCP community. In 2019, at SC-19 (International Conference for High Performance Computing, Networking, Storage, and Analysis), Inspur demonstrated Intel Xeon Platinum 9200, a new HPC-based liquid cooling system combining high-density computing servers with natural circulation evaporative cooling technology. According to Hosting Journalist: "...the server system supports up to 112 cores and 9.3 TFLOPS of FP64 performance and 24 memory channels per node".
- 2020, the company is re-elected as the chair of SPEC Machine Learning and jointly established the development plan of ML test benchmark. By the third quarter of 2019, the Inspur was the 3rd Server Provider.
- In 2021, Inspur's share of servers' supply in China reached 30% of the domestic markets. Inspur launches a new M6 server family that supports 3rd Gen IntelXeon Scalable processors with performance increase by 46 percent compared with previous generation.

== Technical characteristics ==
Inspur follows technical standards and protocol specifications of a number of computing organizations, including OIN (Open Invention Network), SPEC (Standard Performance Evaluation Corporation, joined in 2014), OpenStack (joined 2014), OCP Open Compute Project (joined 2017), ODCC (Open Data Center Committee), and Open19.

=== GPU Servers ===
- AGX-2 is a supercomputer in a compact 2U box, supporting up to 8 GPUs with NVIDIA NVLink 2.0 enabled, delivering performance required by AI workloads and applications.
- AGX-5 is equipped with 16 NVIDIA Tesla V100 Tensor Core GPUs interconnected in one single system via NVSwitch, computing performance is 2 PetaFLOPS, based on NVIDIA’s latest HGX-2 platform.

=== Open Computing Servers ===
- NF8260M5. A high-density 2U 4-socket Inspur NF8260M5 server that is validated for the second-generation Intel Xeon Scalable Processor, optimized with Intel Optane memory, and certified for SAP HANA. It is optimized specifically for cloud infrastructure-aaS, Function-aaS, and Bare-Mental-aaS.
- ODCC (SR-AI Rack) is a rack server that adopts a PCI-E fabric interconnect architecture design. It breaks the traditional server GPU/CPU coupled architecture through connecting the upward CPU computing/scheduling node to the downward GPU box using a PCI-E switch. It is built for scale-out applications and consolidate compute, storage, networking, power and cooling into a rack-scale system.
- OTII-ODCC，NE5260M5 is an intelligent 2U 2-socket server designed and optimized for operations in edge environments, including MEC, 5G / IOT, and AR/VR.

=== Rack servers ===
- NF5280M6 is a 2U dual-socket high-end flagship rackmount server, which is suitable for data analysis and processing, distributed storage in deep learning training.
- NF5280M5 is Inspur's new generation general purpose dual socket server with higher claimed scalability, supporting up to 4 GPU cards in 2U, 24 2.5” drive bays and 24 DDR4 DIMM slots, with optimized thermal/cooling design and modular system architecture.
- NF8260M6 is a 2U 4-socket rackmount server built on the third generation of the Intel Xeon Scalable processor
- NF5488A5 is an AI server that supports 8 third generation NVlink fully connected NVIDIA A100 GPUs and is equipped with 2 AMD CPUs that support PCIe 4.0.

=== Multi-node Servers ===
- i48 multi-node is a server that can be deployed in a 4U chassis with 8 different types of dual-computing nodes to meet computing, PCI-E expansion, storage and other requirements. It supports 100 Gbit/s EDR/OPA network interfaces
