= Chinese Journal of Computers =

Academic journal

- Discipline: Computer science
- Language: Chinese
- Edited by: Ning-Hui Sun

Publication details
- History: 1978–present
- Publisher: China Science Publishing & Media (China)

Standard abbreviations
- ISO 4: Chin. J. Comput.
- MathSciNet: Chinese J. Comput.

Indexing
- CODEN: JIXUDT
- ISSN: 0254-4164
- LCCN: 91644440
- OCLC no.: 647832584

Links
- Journal homepage

The Chinese Journal of Computers (simplified Chinese: 计算机学报; traditional Chinese: 計算機學報; pinyin: Jìsuànjī Xuébào) is a Chinese monthly scientific journal published by China Science Publishing & Media and co-sponsored by the Institute of Computing Technology of the Chinese Academy of Sciences and the China Computer Federation. The editor-in-chief is Ning-Hui Sun. The journal was established in 1978 as a biannual. In 1979 it switched to a quarterly rhythm and in 1981 to bimonthly. Finally, it changed to a monthly publication in 1987. The journal covers all aspects of computer science and technology, including artificial intelligence, information security, computer networks, multimedia, computer graphics, and other new technologies, with an emphasis on research carried out in China.

== Abstracting and indexing ==
The journal is abstracted and indexed in the Chemical Abstracts Service and Scopus.

== See also ==
- Institute of Computing Technology (CAS)
