= Yang Liming =

Chinese physicist

Yang Liming (Chinese: 杨立铭; 5 February 1919 – 12 January 2003), also known as Li-Ming Yang, was a Chinese theoretical physicist and professor at Peking University. A doctoral student of the Nobel laureate Max Born, he made contributions to the research of nuclear shell structure, many-body theory, and the interacting boson model. He was elected an academician of the Chinese Academy of Sciences in 1991, together with his wife, computer scientist Xia Peisu.

== Early life and education ==
Yang was born on 5 February 1919 in Lishui County, Jiangsu, Republic of China. When he was in high school, the Second Sino-Japanese War broke out and Lishui was occupied by the Imperial Japanese Army. Yang became a war refugee and fled across China, finally arriving in Sichuan half a year later. There he completed his secondary education at National No. 2 High School of Hechuan and entered National Central University, then exiled in Chongqing, in 1938. After graduating four years later with a degree in mechanics, he worked at Central Mechanics Factory in Kunming for a year, before returning to National Central University as an assistant professor.

== Career in the United Kingdom ==
In 1944, Yang passed the government examination for study abroad, and was sent to the United Kingdom in 1945, where he worked and trained at Renold Works. In 1946, Max Born accepted him as a graduate student at the University of Edinburgh. Yang earned his Ph.D. in theoretical physics in just two years, and continued to conduct postdoctoral research under Born afterwards. He published six papers in the field, including "Nuclear Shell Structure and Nuclear Density" which explains the recently discovered magic numbers for nucleons.

== Career in China ==
Two years after the founding of the People's Republic of China, Yang and his wife Xia Peisu returned to China in 1951. They both became faculty members at Tsinghua University, although Yang was soon transferred to Peking University during Communist China's reorganization of higher education on the Soviet model in 1952. At Peking University he served as associate professor, professor, and later doctoral advisor. In the late 1950s, he and Yu Min co-authored a textbook on the theories of nuclear physics.

Starting in the late 1950s, Yang advanced many-body theory in condensed matter physics, which was pioneered by Keith Brueckner. In the 1970s, he conducted research and proposed new theories for the interacting boson model (IBM). In 1985, he taught as a visiting professor at Yale University on the invitation of Francesco Iachello, a co-inventor of IBM. He taught at the Technical University of Munich in 1986, and collaborated with Akito Arima, the other co-inventor of IBM in Japan.

Over a teaching career spanning more than four decades, Yang educated a large number of students, including more than 30 doctoral and master's students. In 1991, Yang Liming and his wife Xia Peisu were both elected as academicians of the Chinese Academy of Sciences.

== Personal life ==
In 1945, Yang met Xia Peisu, an alumna of National Central University. They married in 1950, when they were both studying at the University of Edinburgh. She later became a pioneering computer scientist, acclaimed as the "mother of computer science" in China. The couple had two sons, Yang Yuenian and Yang Yuemin. The children followed the footsteps of their parents: Yuenian became a computer scientist, and Yuemin a physicist.

Yang died on 12 January 2003, aged 83.
