= Gdium =

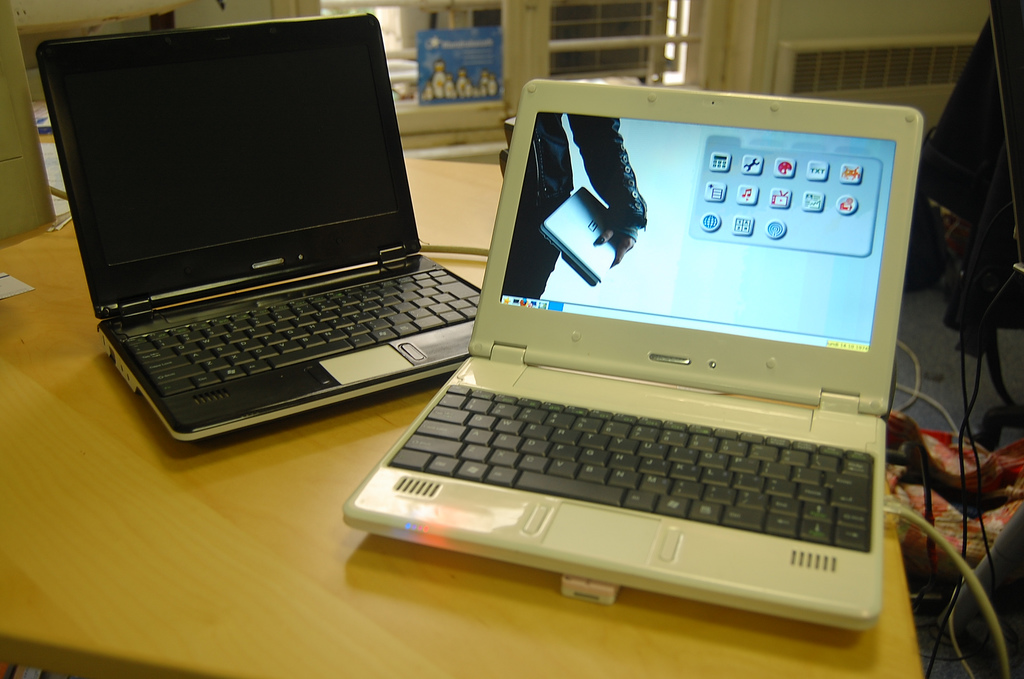
- Developer: EMTEC
- Type: Netbook
- Introductory price: $429 USD/ 359€

The Gdium is a subnotebook / netbook computer produced by EMTEC. The Gdium product is distinguished by its unique Loongson MIPS processor and the use of a USB key as a primary storage device. The Gdium netbook is marketed as an interface device to the Gdium "learning community"—a website that provides hardware support, MIPS builds of open-source software, Linux computing tips, and educational resources targeted towards teachers and students within the K-12 demographic.

== Technical overview ==
The EMTEC Gdium Liberty 1000 is built on an STMicroelectronics Loongson 2F MIPS microprocessor and uses a proprietary form-factored USB key, called the G-Key, as its primary storage medium. The G-Key, which fits in a specially designed USB slot recessed within the unit, is available in 8GB and 16GB capacities. The key generates no noise, and is less susceptible to mechanical shock damage than hard drives. It also includes an SD card reader, which provides support for MMC, SD and SDHC cards as supplemental storage.

The Gdium uses Mandriva as its sole operating system and boots in approximately 30 seconds. The desktop uses the Metacity window manager with a lxplanel and idesk-based interface. Like most modern Linux distributions, open-source software applications such as OpenOffice.org, Mozilla Firefox, Thunderbird, and The GIMP are included in the default installation. There are no compilations of Microsoft Windows, OS X, or Ubuntu available for the MIPS architecture, but e.g. Debian offers packages compiled for MIPS.

The EMTEC Gdium Liberty 1000 specifications are as follows:

- Screen size: 10" (254 mm)
- Resolution: 1024 x 600
- CPU: 900 MHz 64-bit Loongson 2F by STMicroelectronics
- Operating system: Mandriva G-Linux
- Video chipset: Silicon Motion SM502 (16 MB dedicated video memory)
- RAM: 512 MB DDR2 (supports up to 1 GB, not user upgradeable)
- Primary Storage: 16 GB to 32 GB USB G-Key (removable)
- Webcam: 0.3 or 1.3 Mpx
- Keyboard: 240mm long and 96.8mm wide.
- Wireless LAN: IEEE 802.11b/g
- LAN: 10/100 Mbit/s
- Battery: 5000 mAh / 2.5 hours<refLaptop Magazine's In-Depth Hands on Review April 9, 2009</ref> (some users report ~30 minutes)
- SD / SDHC card reader
- 3 USB ports available: 2 standard USB 2.0 and 1 USB 2.0 for the G-Key
- 1 VGA ext 15pin D-sub enabling 1280x1024 external monitor resolution
- Speakers/headset Output: 1 port for 3.5mm audio jack
- Microphone Input: 1 port for 3.5mm microphone jack
- Dimensions: 250 x 182 x 32 mm
- Weight: 1.2 kg

== Starting phase ==
- Gdium was originally planned for release in September 2008, but after multiple hardware and software glitches attributed to poorly managed contracted labor across France and China, the product was delayed until end of February 2009 for its soft launch. Gdium's soft launch was on the Belgium market and received a mild user acceptance.
- The target price of the Gdium at Euro 379 makes the Gdium an expensive and poorly valued netbook given its modest hardware and short battery life. Analysts have wondered if a market actually exist for it.

== Status ==
Website went down around Sept 2013. It's unsure if the community is still alive elsewhere.
