= Ci Yungui =

Chinese scientist

Ci Yungui (simplified Chinese: 慈云桂; traditional Chinese: 慈雲桂; pinyin: Cíyún guì, 1917–1990), male, born in Tongcheng, Anhui Province, was a Chinese computer scientist widely honored as "the father of China's supercomputers". He led the development of China's first vacuum‑tube digital computer prototype, first transistorized general‑purpose computer and first supercomputer. Most of the researchers who successfully developed the "Galaxy" and "Tianhe-1" supercomputer series were his students. In 1980, Ci Yungui was elected an Academician of the Chinese Academy of Sciences.

== Early life and education ==
Ci Yungui was born in Tongcheng, Anhui Province of China in 1917. He graduated from Tongcheng Middle School in 1935 and later attended Hunan University, initially in mechanical engineering before transferring to the electrical engineering program due to wartime disruptions. He completed his degree in 1943 and was recommended to the graduate program of the Radio Research Institute of Tsinghua University at Southwest Associated University in Kunming.

In 1946, he was sent to the United Kingdom to study radar systems, returning later that year to join the faculty of Tsinghua University's Physics Department.

== Academic and professional career ==
=== Tsinghua University (1946–1950) ===
Ci served as a teaching assistant and lecturer in physics, helping establish the university's early radio laboratories.

=== Dalian Naval Academy (1950–1954) ===
He became an associate professor and later deputy director of the Radar Communications Department, contributing to China's early naval radar and sonar training programs.

=== PLA Military Academy of Engineering (1954–1970) ===
In November 1954, Ci Yungui moved to the People's Liberation Army Military Academy of Engineering in Harbin, where he was promoted to professor of radar and computing, and founding director of the Department of Electronic Computers (1966).

During this period, he led the development of China's first vacuum‑tube digital computer prototype (Model “901”, in year 1958) and China's first series of transistorized general‑purpose computers (441B‑I, 441B‑II, 441B‑III, in the 1960s).

=== Changsha Institute of Technology & National University of Defense Technology (1970–1984) ===
In 1970, Ci moved to Changsha, where he founded and chaired the Department of Electronic Computers, led the Computer Research Institute, and later served as Vice President of the National University of Defense Technology (NUDT). In 1980, Ci Yungui was elected an Academician of the Chinese Academy of Sciences.

Ci Yungui was the chief designer of

- The 151‑3/4 large‑scale integrated‑circuit computer of 2 millions operations per second (1977–1978),
- China's first 100-million‑operations‑per‑second supercomputer, the Yinhe-1 system (1983). This achievement placed China among the countries capable of designing high‑performance supercomputers.

== Research contributions ==
Ci's work spanned radar engineering, sonar systems, digital computer architecture, and large‑scale integrated circuits. His major contributions include:

- Establishing China's first naval radar and sonar engineering training programs
- Designing the 901 digital computer prototype (1958)
- Leading the development of China's first transistorized general‑purpose computers
- Pioneering integrated‑circuit computer design in the 1970s
- Leading the successful development of China's first supercomputer capable of operating at 100 million calculations per second, ushering in a new era for the country's computer industry.
- Publishing over 100 academic papers and co‑authoring several English‑language monographs.

== Honors and recognition ==
- Academician of the Chinese Academy of Sciences (1980)
- Honorary professorships at Beijing Institute of Technology, Hunan University, and Huazhong University of Science and Technology
- Widely known as "the father of China's supercomputers"
- In 1995, the National University of Defense Technology established the "Ci Yungui Computer Science and Technology Award" to commemorate his achievements.

== Other information ==
- Ci joined the Chinese Communist Party in 1956.
- He died in Beijing on 21 July 1990 at age 73.

== See also ==
- National University of Defense Technology
- Major events in computer science in China
- Galaxy (supercomputer series)
