= Galaxy (supercomputer series) =

Galaxy (Chinese: 銀河; pinyin: Yínhé), also called "Yinhe" or "Milky Way", refers to a series of supercomputers developed by the National University of Defense Technology of China, beginning in the early 1980s. The series played a foundational role in the development of China's high‑performance computing capabilities and laid the groundwork for later systems such as Tianhe-1 and Tianhe-2.

== History ==
=== Galaxy‑I ===
In 1978, Deng Xiaoping said "China cannot achieve the Four Modernizations without supercomputers!", and entrusted the development of the supercomputer to the National University of Defense Technology. Professor Ci Yungui was appointed as the chief designer.

In 1983, China's first supercomputer, the "Galaxy-1" or "Yinhe-1", capable of performing over 100 million operations per second (MFLOPS), was successfully developed by the National University of Defense Technology. And China became the third country in the world, after the United States and Japan, to successfully develop a supercomputer. General Zhang Aiping gladly inscribed the name "银河" ("Yinghe" or "Galaxy") for the machine.

=== Galaxy‑II ===
In March, 1988, the Galaxy‑II (or Yinhe-II) project started. It completed in 1992, achieving performance on the order of 1 billion operations per second. "Galaxy-II" made China one of the few countries in the world at that time capable of issuing medium- and long-term numerical weather forecasts.

=== Galaxy‑III ===
Galaxy‑III, completed in 1997, adopted a distributed parallel architecture and reached a peak performance of approximately 13 GFLOPS (13 billion operations per second). "Yinhe-3" supercomputer passed national certification on 19 June 1997.

== Legacy and influence ==
The Galaxy series is widely regarded as the technological and institutional predecessor of China's modern supercomputing efforts. National University of Defense Technology, the developer of the Galaxy line, later led the creation of the Tianhe supercomputer line, including Tianhe-1, Tianhe-1A and Tianhe-2, which achieved 33.86 PFLOPS and ranked #1 on the TOP500 list for six consecutive editions between 2013 and 2015.

The development of Tianhe‑2 was supported by the Chinese government's 863 Program and involved collaboration with the IT firm Inspur. The U.S. export restrictions on Intel processors in 2015 further accelerated China's push toward fully domestic supercomputing architectures, culminating in systems such as Sunway TaihuLight.

In November 2024, the Tianhe Exa-node Prototype supercomputer in Tianjin was ranked No1 in GreenGraph500 Big Data, while the Tianhe supercomputer in Changsha topped the GreenGraph500 Small Data.

== See also ==
- Supercomputing in China
- Tianhe-1
- Tianhe-2
- Sunway TaihuLight
- National University of Defense Technology (NUDT)
