= Li Guojie (computer scientist) =

Chinese computer scientist

- 李国杰
- Born: May 29, 1943 (age 83); Shaoyang, Hunan, China
- Education: Peking University; University of Chinese Academy of Sciences; Purdue University
- Spouse: Zhang Dihua
- Children: 2
- Scientific career
- Fields: Computer science
- Workplaces: School of Computer and Control Engineering, University of Chinese Academy of Sciences
- Doctoral advisor: Benjamin Wah
- Doctoral students: Sun Ninghui

Chinese name
- Traditional Chinese: 李國傑
- Simplified Chinese: 李国杰
Transcriptions
Standard Mandarin
- Hanyu Pinyin: Lǐ Guójié

Li Guojie (Chinese: 李国杰; born 29 May 1943) is a Chinese computer scientist who served as dean of the School of Computer and Control Engineering, University of the Chinese Academy of Sciences.

== Biography ==
Li was born in Shaoyang, Hunan, Republic of China, on May 29, 1943. His father, Li Binqing (李彬卿), was an educator who served as president of Shaodong County No.2 High School after the establishment of the Communist State. After high school in 1960, he was accepted to Hunan Agricultural Mechanization College. Because the school was closed, he was assigned to work as a mechanic in Lengshuijiang Iron and Steel Factory. In September 1962 he entered Peking University, majoring in the Department of Physics, where he graduated in 1968. In December 1968 he was assigned to a farm in southwest China's Guizhou province. A year and a half later, he was assigned to a crystal factory in the suburb of the capital city Guiyang. In February 1973, he was transferred to a computer factory in his home-city Shaoyang. After the resumption of National College Entrance Examination, he earned his Master of Engineering degree from the University of Chinese Academy of Sciences in August 1981. He earned his doctor's degree at Purdue University under the direction of Benjamin Wah. He was a researcher at the University of Illinois between August 1985 and December 1986. He returned to China in January 1987 and became a researcher at the Institute of Computing Technology, Chinese Academy of Sciences. In February 1990 he was appointed director of the State Intelligent Computer Research and Development Center by the State Scientific and Technological Commission. In 1995 he founded the Shuguang Information Industry Co., Ltd. He assumed the position of director of the Institute of Computing Technology, Chinese Academy of Sciences in December 1999, and remained dean until January 2011. In January 2012 he was chosen as dean of the School of Computer and Control Engineering, University of Chinese Academy of Sciences. He was president of China Computer Federation (CCF).

He was a delegate to the 9th and 10th National People's Congress. He was a delegate to the 17th National Congress of the Chinese Communist Party.

== Personal life ==
Li married Zhang Dihua (张蒂华), the daughter of Zhang Qixian (张其弦), an engineer who died in Yemen. The couple have a son named Li Gang (李刚), and a daughter named Li Juan (李涓).

== Honours and awards ==
- 1994 Science and Technology Progress Award of the Ho Leung Ho Lee Foundation
- 1995 State Science and Technology Progress Award (Second Class)
- 1997 State Science and Technology Progress Award (First Class)
- November 1995 Member of the Chinese Academy of Engineering (CAE)
- 2001 State Science and Technology Progress Award (Second Class)
- 2004 State Science and Technology Progress Award (Second Class)
- 2011 Fellow of The World Academy of Sciences
