= Deepin =

Linux distribution

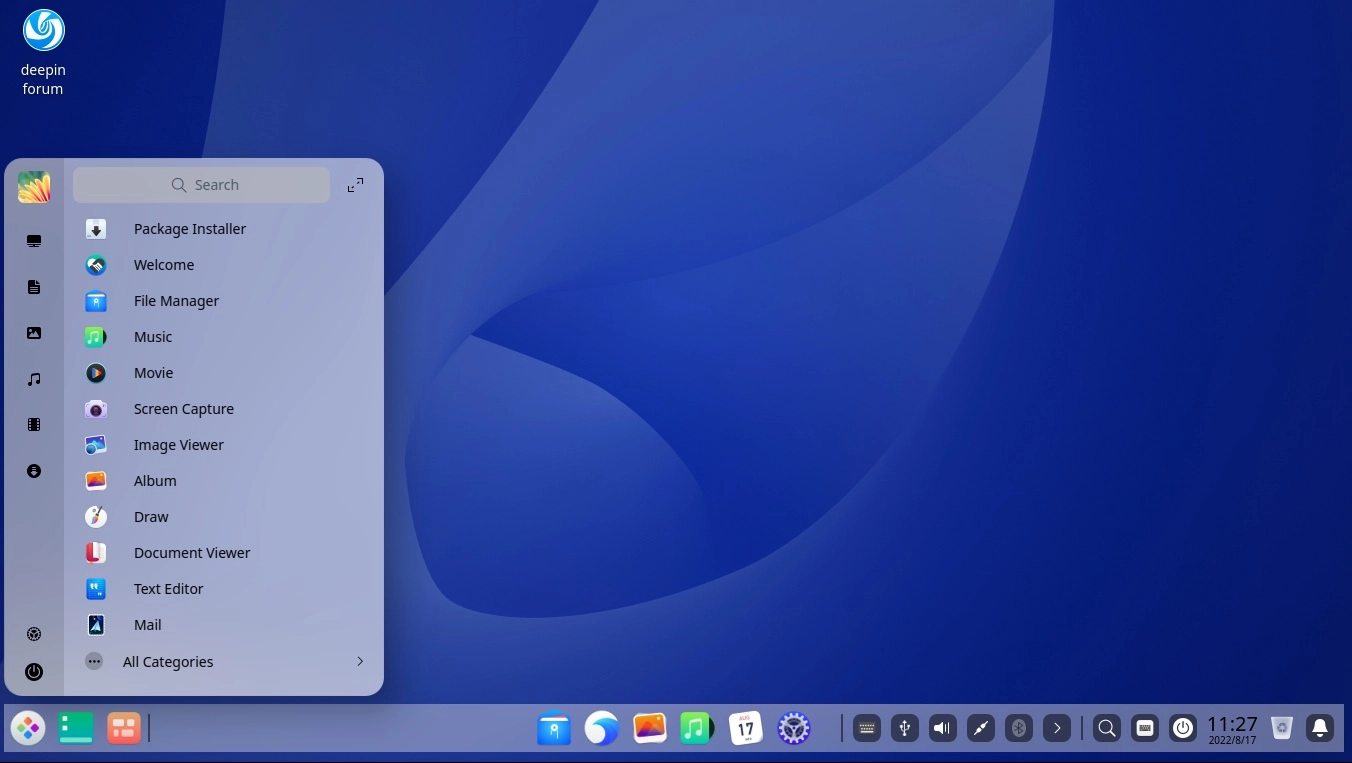
- Deepin 23 desktop, with the Qt-based Deepin Desktop Environment
- Native name: 深度操作系统; Shēndù Cāozuò-xìtǒng
- Developer: Deepin Technology Co., Ltd.
- OS family: Linux (Unix-like)
- Working state: Current
- Source model: Open-source
- Initial release: 28 February 2004; 22 years ago
- Latest release: 25.0.2 / 8 July 2026
- Marketing target: Personal computing
- Available in: Multi-lingual (more than 30)
- Update method: Deepin Software Center
- Package manager: APT, dpkg
- Supported platforms: x86-64, RISCV64, ARM64, LoongArch64
- Kernel type: Monolithic (Linux Kernel)
- Default user interface: Deepin Desktop Environment (Qt-based)
- License: Free software licenses (mainly GPL)
- Official website: www.deepin.org

deepin (Chinese: 深度操作系统; pinyin: Shēndù Cāozuò-xìtǒng; formerly known as Linux Deepin and Hiweed Linux) is a Linux distribution, formerly based on Ubuntu and Debian, that features the Deepin Desktop Environment (DDE), a desktop environment built on Qt and available for a variety of distributions. The Deepin userbase is predominantly Chinese, though DDE is in most prominent Linux distributions' repositories as an alternative desktop environment. The company behind the development, Deepin Technology, a wholly owned subsidiary of UnionTech (统信软件), is based in Wuhan, China.

== History ==
The distribution began in 2004 as Hiweed Linux. In 2011, the development team behind Deepin established a company named Deepin Technology to support commercial development of the operating system. The company received business investments the same year it was founded.

Deepin Technology joined the Linux Foundation in 2015. In 2019, Huawei started to ship Linux laptops pre-installed with Deepin.

The South China Morning Post reported that Chinese microprocessor company Loongson created a partnership in 2020 with UnionTech and Sunway to develop and promote the Deepin operating system in order to reduce Chinese dependency on Microsoft Windows.

Deepin introduced a new package manager called "linglong" in 2022.

In 2024, Deepin integrated AI into its (new) IDE, photo editing, search (now called "Grand Search"), and two new chatbot assistants: one for general knowledge and one for knowledge on Deepin.

In June 2024, Deepin announced it was joining the "Prosperity 2036" initiative, whose goal was to establish an open-standard system and open-source software stack based on RISC-V, enabling RISC-V hardware and software "to be recognized as a mainstream instruction set architecture" by 2036.

Starting with the release of Version 23 in August 2024, Deepin began to provide improved hardware support for processor architectures other than x86: install media and packages for ARM64 and RISC-V processors were added to the existing support for x86 and LoongArch.

== Overview ==
Deepin includes a mix of open-source and proprietary programs such as Google Chrome, Spotify and Steam. It also includes a software suite of applications developed by Deepin Technology, as well as WPS Office, 360 Security Guard, and many others.

The development of Deepin is led by China-based Deepin Technology Co., Ltd (Chinese: 武汉深之度科技有限公司; pinyin: Wǔhàn Shēn-zhī-dù Kējì Yǒuxiàn Gōngsī). The company generates revenue through the sale of technical support and other services related to it. As of 1 January 2020, Deepin Technology is a wholly owned subsidiary of UnionTech (统信软件; Tǒngxìn Ruǎnjiàn). The release cycle has followed various schedules but currently aims at four releases per year. Releases are delayed if the work of development and testing has not been completed.

The distribution is widely praised for its aesthetics in various reviews, while it has also been criticized for various perceived breaches in user privacy.

== Market share ==
According to Deepin, in December 2022 the operating system had more than 3 million users worldwide, supported 33 languages, and had accumulated more than 80 million downloads since 2008 (when it was renamed "Deepin" from "Hiweed Linux" and also changed to Ubuntu and Gnome as a basis).

== Deepin Desktop Environment ==
Deepin features its own desktop environment called Deepin DE or DDE for short. It is written in Qt. The distribution also maintains their own Window Manager dde-kwin. The desktop environment was described as "the single most beautiful desktop on the market" by Jack Wallen writing for TechRepublic. The DDE is also available in the software repositories of Fedora 30.

Since 2019, DDE was also available on openSUSE Tumbleweed and Leap. However, on 7 May 2025, openSUSE announced the removal of DDE due to substantial packaging policy violations. In addition, there have been reports of recurring security issues, insufficient patching of vulnerabilities, inconsistent communication and limited upstream resources. As a result, maintaining a secure and reliable integration of DDE within openSUSE has become increasingly untenable according to maintainer team.

DDE is available on Arch Linux.

== Deepin applications ==
Deepin comes with a number of applications built via the DTK (Deepin Tool Kit), which is based on C++ and Qt. The following is a list of Deepin Applications created by the Deepin development team:

- Deepin Boot Maker
- Deepin Installer
- Deepin File Manager
- Deepin System Monitor
- Deepin Package Manager
- Deepin Font Installer
- Deepin Clone
- Deepin Picker
- Deepin Store
- Deepin Screen Recorder
- Deepin Voice Recorder
- Deepin Screenshot
- Deepin Terminal
- Deepin Image Viewer
- Deepin Movie
- Deepin Cloud Print
- Deepin OpenSymbol
- Deepin Music
- Deepin Calendar
- Deepin Remote Assistant
- Deepin Manual
- Deepin Emacs
- Deepin Presentation Assistant
- Deepin Calculator
- Graphics Driver Manager
- Deepin Repair
- Deepin Editor

=== Deepin Installer ===
Deepin comes with an installer named "Deepin Installer" that was created by Deepin Technology. The Installer was praised by Swapnil Bhartiya writing for linux.com as having "the simplest installation procedure" that was also "quite pleasant." Writing for Forbes, Jason Evangelho complained about the installer requiring the user to select their location from a world map, though concluded by saying, "Aside from my little time zone selection pet peeve, the installer is beautiful, brisk and very intuitive."

== Reception ==
The distribution is generally praised for its aesthetics by users and reviewers alike, such as linux.com, Fossbytes and TechRepublic.

=== CNZZ incident ===
When Deepin was accused in 2018 of containing spyware through the use of statistics software within their App Store, the company made an official statement clarifying that it did not and would not collect private user information. According to Deepin, CNZZ is a website similar to Google Analytics that collects anonymous usage information such as the screen size, browser and other user agent information to "analyze how the Deepin store was being used, in order to improve it."

On 20 July 2018, Deepin removed CNZZ statistics from the Deepin App Store website due to the backlash.

=== Performance ===
Deepin's reputation was that it had relatively high CPU and memory demands when it was still based on GTK and HTML technologies, even when the system was idle. After switching to the Qt-based desktop environment, performance improved, as was noted by Linux.com in its September 2018 review of Deepin 15.7.

=== Concerns about connections to Chinese government ===
Radware's head of threat research has commented on concerns about analytics collected by Deepin, and whether these are sent to the Chinese government: while the CNZZ analytics service has been removed, analytics are still collected, now by "Umeng+". According to cybersecurity lawyer Steven T. Snyder, due to the sheer size of Deepin's codebase, it is impossible to really scrutinize all the code comprising it to be sure the Chinese government doesn't have backdoors. The project does remain fully open source allowing anyone to review, modify or change the code to meet their standards.

=== OpenSUSE removal of Deepin Desktop Environment ===
On 7 May 2025, the SUSE Security Team announced the removal of the Deepin Desktop Environment (DDE) from openSUSE Tumbleweed and the planned Leap 16.0 release. This was motivated by a documented history of persistent security vulnerabilities in various DDE components since 2017, difficulties in achieving satisfactory remediation with Deepin's upstream developers, and concerns over the upstream project's security culture. The discovery of a packaging policy violation in the deepin-feature-enable package (introduced in April 2021) that using a "license agreement" bypassed the security reviews and installed unverified components triggered a comprehensive review of the Deepin Desktop Environment (DDE) that culminated in the removal of the desktop environment from the distribution.

=== Fedora Removal of All Deepin Software ===
On May 20, 2026, Fedora's Engineering Steering Committee (FESCo) voted to remove all Deepin programs due to months of no responses and packages being left in disrepair.
