= Great Wall 0520CH =

Computer developed in China

The Great Wall 0520CH (Chinese: 长城电脑之0520; pinyin: Chángchéng diànnǎo zhī 0520) was the first personal computer developed in China. It was created in 1985 by the State Computer Industrial Administration with Greatwall.

Officially launched in June 1985, the primary engineering achievement of the 0520CH was the software and hardware necessary to process the large number of Chinese characters, which required a significant amount of memory just for character bitmaps, a challenge for computers with low memory capacity at the time.
