= Loongson =

Chinese microprocessor manufacturer

Loongson Technology Corporation Limited

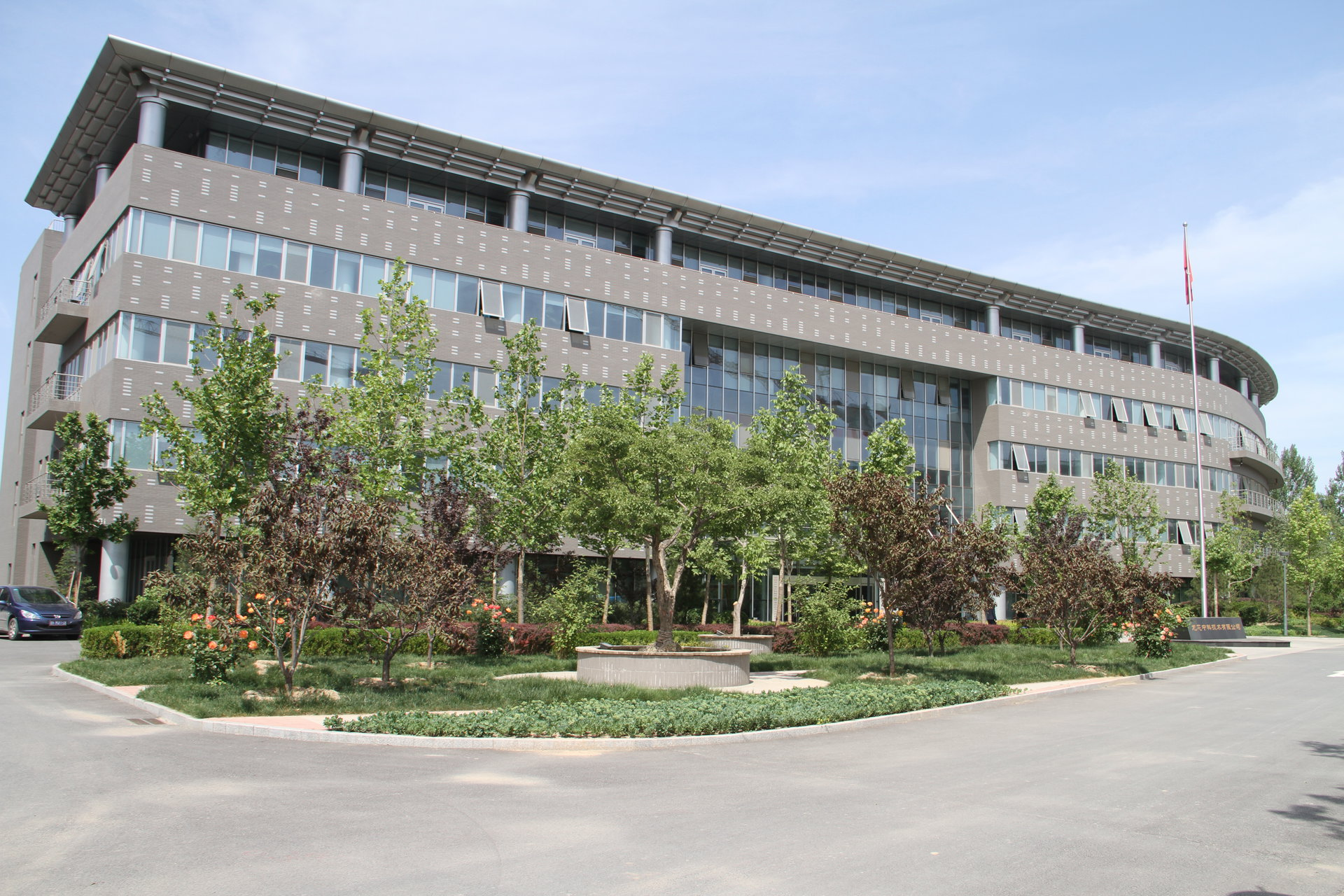
- Native name: 龙芯中科技术有限公司
- Type: Public, Mixed ownership enterprise
- Traded as: SSE: 688047
- Industry: Semiconductor technology industry
- Founded: April 2010; 16 years ago
- Founder: Hu Weiwu
- Headquarters: People's Republic of China; Loongson Industrial Park, Building 2, Zhongguancun Environmental protection park, Haidian District, Beijing, China
- Area served: Global
- Key people: Hu Weiwu (Chairman)
- Services: Chip design, motherboard design, operating system and kernel maintenance, important software and library maintenance
- Number of employees: More than 400 (estimate)
- Website: www.loongson.cn

Loongson

General information
- Marketed by: Loongson Technology, Jiangsu Lemote Tech Co., Ltd, Dawning Information Industry, and others
- Designed by: Institute of Computing Technology (ICT), Chinese Academy of Sciences, Loongson Technology, Jiangsu Lemote Tech Co., Ltd
- Common manufacturer: STMicroelectronics, SMIC

Performance
- Max. CPU clock rate: 800 MHz to 2.0 GHz
- HyperTransport speeds: 800 MHz to 3.0 GHz

Physical specifications
- Cores: 1–8

Architecture and classification
- Application: Desktop, server, supercomputer, industrial device, embedded device, aerospace
- Technology node: 180 nm to 12 nm
- Microarchitecture: see text
- Instruction set: MIPS64 (with LoongISA extensions); LoongArch

Loongson (simplified Chinese: 龙芯; traditional Chinese: 龍芯; pinyin: Lóngxīn; lit. 'Dragon Core') is the name of a family of general-purpose, MIPS architecture-compatible, later in-house LoongArch architecture microprocessors, as well as the name of the Chinese fabless company (Loongson Technology) that develops them. The processors are alternately called Godson processors, which is described as its academic name.

== History ==
The Godson processors, based on MIPS architecture, were initially developed at the Institute of Computing Technology (ICT), Chinese Academy of Sciences (CAS). The chief architect was Hu Weiwu. The development of the first Loongson chip was started in 2001. The aim of the Godson project was to develop "high performance general-purpose microprocessors in China", and to become technologically self-sufficient as part of the Made in China 2025 plan. The development was supported by funding via the Chinese Communist Party's 10th and 11th Five-Year Plans.

In 2010 the company was commercialized as a separate entity, and in April 2010 Loongson Technology Corporation Limited was formally established and settled in Zhongguancun, Beijing, China. The company is a public–private partnership between ICT and Beijing-based chip designer BLX IC Design Corporation. BLX itself was a spin-off from ICT, and was founded in 2002 with Jiangsu Zhongyi Group. As Loongson is a fabless designer, at least some processors were fabricated and marketed by STMicroelectronics.

The South China Morning Post reported that since 2020 Loongson has been partnering with UnionTech and Sunway to develop and promote the Debian-Linux-based Deepin operating system in order to reduce China's dependency on Microsoft Windows.

In 2021, Loongson filed for an initial public offering on the Shanghai Stock Exchange STAR Market. The company was seeking to raise US$500 million. Details from this IPO suggested Loongson had needed RMB 400 million annual funding in its first 10 years of existence and that the company had only broken even in 2015.

In April 2024 Loongson processors got a large boost when a school district in the city of Hebi commenced a trial of 10,000 PCs powered by computers featuring the Loongson 3A5000 processor and the Deepin-based Unity Operating System. According to The Register, this trial project is to be used to promote the use of Loongson-and-Linux computers within the Chinese school system, which could potentially result in 50 million Loongson-based computers being sold to Chinese schools every year until 2030.

=== U.S. sanctions ===
In March 2023, the United States Department of Commerce added Loongson to the Bureau of Industry and Security's Entity List for acquisition of American technology to support the People's Liberation Army (PLA).

== Instruction set architectures ==
=== MIPS ===
Loongson began by using the MIPS64 instruction set architecture (ISA). The internal microarchitecture was independently developed by ICT. Early implementations of the family lacked four instructions patented by MIPS Technologies (US4814976A, unaligned load-store) to avoid legal issues.

In 2007, a deal was reached by MIPS Technologies and ICT. STMicroelectronics bought a MIPS license for Loongson, and thus the processor can be promoted as MIPS-based or MIPS-compatible instead of MIPS-like.

In June 2009, ICT licensed the MIPS32 and MIPS64 architectures directly from MIPS Technologies.

In August 2011, Loongson Technology Corp. Ltd. licensed the MIPS32 and MIPS64 architectures from MIPS Technologies, Inc. for continued development of MIPS-based Loongson CPU cores.

In January 2024, Loongson won a case over rights to use MIPS architecture.

=== LoongISA ===
The Loongson 3A2000 in 2015 saw the adoption of LoongISA 1.0, an expanded instruction set that is a superset of MIPS64 release 2. It can be broken down into:

- LoongEXT, general-purpose extensions, 148 instructions
- LoongVZ, virtualisation extensions to the "VZ" system introduced in MIPS64 release 5, 5 instructions
- LoongBT, faster x86 and ARM binary translation, 213 instructions
- LoongSIMD, formerly LoongMMI (in Loongson 2E/F), for 128-bit SIMD, 1014 instructions
- MIPS SIMD Architecture (MSA), DSP, and VZ modules from MIPS Release 5

The LoongISA instructions were introduced as part of the GS464E cores. The binary translation instructions have the specific benefit of speeding up Intel x86 CPU emulation at a cost of 5% of the total die area. The new instructions help a QEMU hypervisor translate instructions from x86 to MIPS with only a reported 30% performance penalty.

=== LoongArch ===
Loongson moved to their own processor instruction set architecture (ISA) in 2021 with the release of the reduced instruction set computer (RISC) Loongson 3 5000 series. A Loongson developer described it as "... a new RISC ISA, which is a bit like MIPS or RISC-V. LoongArch includes a reduced 32-bit version (LA32R), a standard 32-bit version (LA32S) and a 64-bit version (LA64)". The stated rationale was to make Loongson and China not dependent on foreign technology or authorisation to develop their processor capability, while not infringing on any technology patents.

The ISA has been referred to as "a fork of MIPS64r6" due to a perceived lack of changes judging from instruction listings. The Register reported in November 2021 that LoongArch might combine the best parts of MIPS and RISC-V, along with custom instructions.

== Cores ==
Loongson has three main families of processor cores, some of which are available as IP cores:

- GS464 series: MIPS64 core with four-way superscalar out-of-order issue. The design originated from the Loongson 2F processor. It was first widely used in the Loongson 3A processor, before also being used in the Loongson 2 series.
  - GS464V was first introduced in 2010 with the Godson 3B, and is a GS464 with vector capabilities.
  - GS464E is an improved version of the GS464. Development had started in 2012 after shortcomings were found in the GS464 processor. The core has multiple improvements, including larger caches and better branch prediction among others, and was better optimised. The core was extended to support LoongISA (extending the MIPS64 R2 architecture).
  - GS464EV is a development of the GS464 series, first used by the 3A4000 processor
- LA464 is the development of the GS464 to support LoongArch. While the initial core of the 3A5000 was noted to be GS464, due to incompatible instruction sets Loongson renamed the 3A5000 core to LA464 in their documentation in August 2021.
- LA664 is the architecture for the 3A6000/3C6000 series processors.

It has been noted by the community that the naming of the Loongson microarchitectures is not consistent, with different products being noted to have the same processor core, even though the instructions sets might not be exactly compatible.

== Processor families ==
Loongson has built 4 processor families from their architectural cores. These are the:

- Godson-1, for consumer electronics and embedded applications
- Godson-2, single core processors for embedded applications and low performance personal computers (Note: The Godson/Loongson 2 series processors have been developed and named mostly sequentially in an alphabetical format.)
- Godson-3, multi-core processors for higher performance computers, high-performance computing and servers (Note: The Godson/Loongson 3 series processors seem to be named according to segment and then a generation number. The segment tends to be A (general purpose PCs), B (seemingly high core counts), and C (server processors). The generation numbers start at 1000 for the first series processors, and then increment generally to the next thousand. There are some processors that may be between generation products, that have a x5000 designation.)
- Loongson 3, LoongArch processors

=== Godson-1 ===
The first Loongson processor, the Godson-1, was designed in 2001, released in 2002, and is a 32-bit CPU running at a clock speed of 266 MHz. It is fabricated with 0.18 micron CMOS process, has 8 KB of data cache, 8 KB of instruction cache and a 64-bit floating-point unit, capable of 200 double-precision MFLOPS. Godson-1 series chips either use the GS132 or GS232 cores.

Loongson X is a radiation hardened version of the GS232 core used in the Godson-1.

=== Godson-2 / Loongson 2 ===
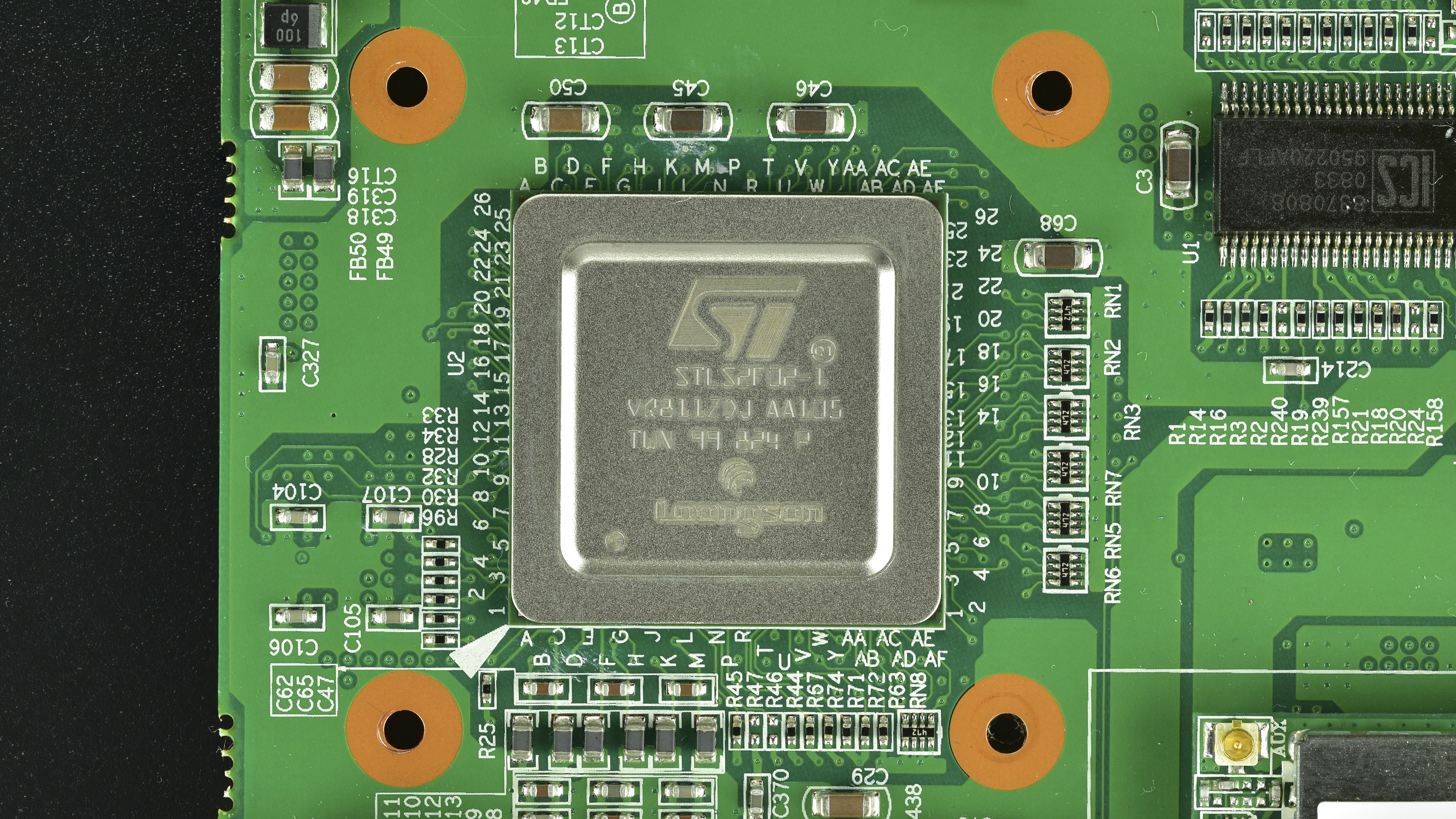
Loongson 2F CPU from STMicroelectronics in a Gdium laptop

The Loongson 2 is a family of MIPS III compatible processors. It adds 64-bit ability to the Loongson architecture. Later Loongson 2 processors migrated to being MIPS64 compatible, due to sharing the GS464 core with the Loongson 3 series.

The development plan for the Godson-2 was to develop it from a CPU to a SOC. The 2E (2006) was a CPU, the 2F (2007) integrated the north bridge, the 2G (2008) had a hyper transport link between the CPU/north bridge and an integrated GPU/south bridge, and the 2H (2009) integrated all these functions into a SOC. The design of the 2F was the basis of the GS464 core. The 2G uses a single GS464 core; the 2H uses the GS464V core, as a single-core version of the initial Godson 3B.

=== Godson 3 / Loongson 3 MIPS processors ===
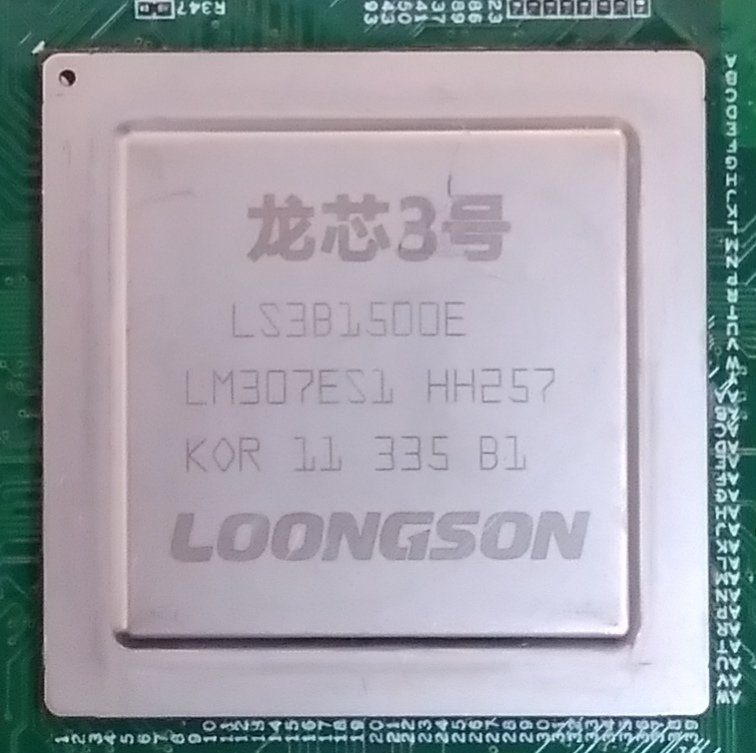
Loongson 3B1500E CPU

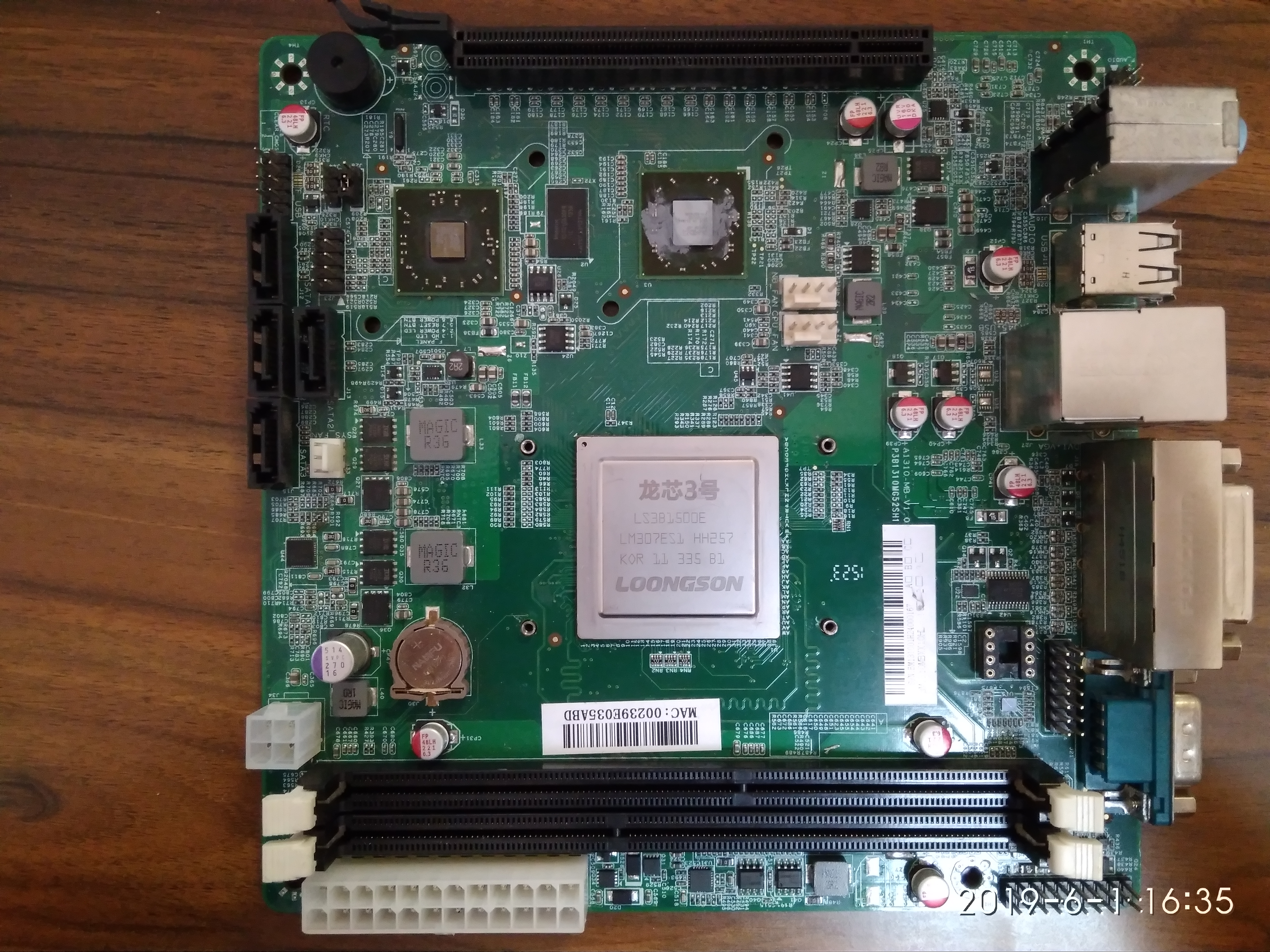
Lemote-A1310 mini-ITX motherboard (with Loongson 3B1500E)

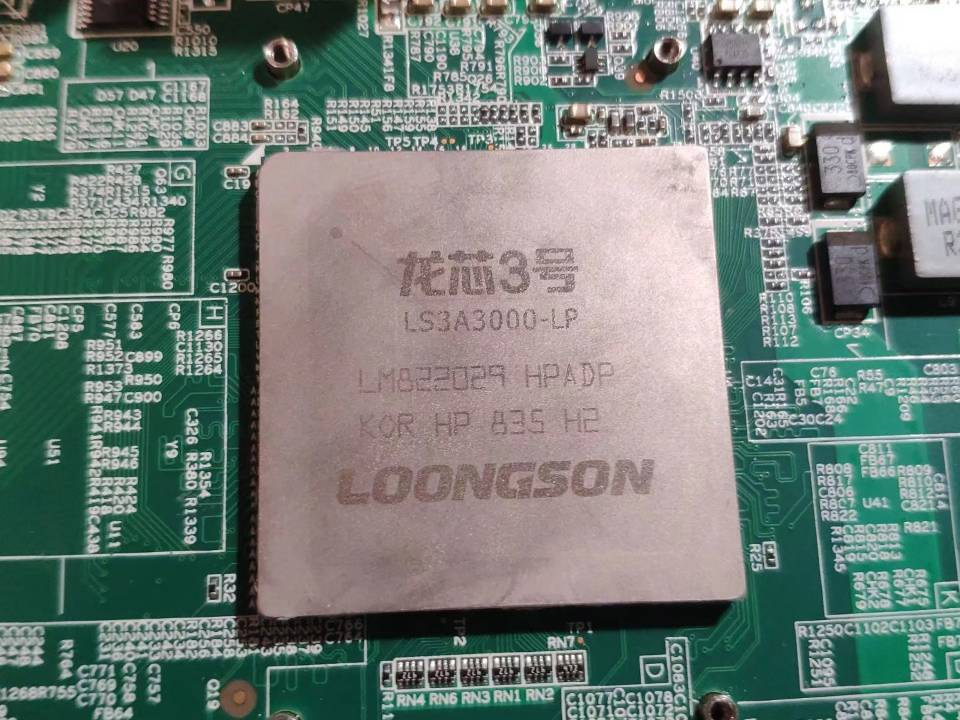
Loongson 3A3000 CPU

The Loongson 3 family of processors are "...multi-core CPU[s] designed for high performance desktops, servers, and clusters". They were designed as the first Loongson processors that had multiple cores. The processors were initially designed to use LoongISA - i.e. the MIPS64 release 2 ISA with additional extensions. The designers also attempted to optimise x86 translation on the chip.

==== 1000 series ====
The first production processor was the Loongson 3A, which used 4 GS464 cores.

The designers noted that they would produce a 3B chip with enhanced processing and vector capabilities, with 8 cores, and a 3C for server applications with up to 16 cores. The 8-core Loongson 3B was noted to use the upgraded GS464V core, with extended vector capabilities. This was followed by the Loonson 3C which used 16 GS464V cores.

The 3B1000, and related 2I, both failed as processors due to design errors. In May 2013 development of the 3C was suspended, in favour of developing the 3A2000 processor.

==== 1500 and 2000 series ====
In 2015, the 3A1500 and 3B2000 were released using the enhanced GS464E cores. The improved microarchitecture core allowed better performance, reportedly 3 times as fast as the 3A1000, as well as introducing the LoongISA enhanced instruction set. The 3A1500 was for embedded applications, while the 3B2000 was for servers and PCs.

==== 3000 series ====
In 2017, Loongson released the 3A3000. The performance of the 3A3000 is reported to be equivalent to the Intel J1900 processor (released in 2013).

==== 4000 series ====
In late-2019 the 3A and 3B 4000 series were released. They used the upgraded GS464EV microarchitecture.

=== Loongson 3 LoongArch processors ===
==== 5000 series, transition to LoongArch ====
In July 2021 the Loongson 3 5000 series was released. The processor series was Loongson's first with their own developed instruction set architecture (ISA), called "LoongArch". The processors announced included the 3A5000, a four-core desktop CPU, and the 3C5000L, a sixteen-core server CPU based on four 3A5000 in a single package. Both CPUs were reported to be fabricated on a 12 nm process. While the processor was noted to be using the GS464V cores initially, due to incompatibility with previous versions, the cores were renamed to LA464 in August 2021.

The Register reported that "the 3A5000 is said to be 50% faster and 30% more power efficient" than the preceding 3A4000. Phoronix reported that the 3A5000 CPU was "roughly on a par with the likes of the Intel Core i3 8109U / Core 2 Quad Q9500 / Core i5 750 (roughly the state of the art in 2008), or Armv8-based Phytium FT-2000".

In April 2023, Loongson launched the 3D5000 processor for data centers and cloud computing, based on the LoongArch instruction set architecture.

==== 6000 series ====
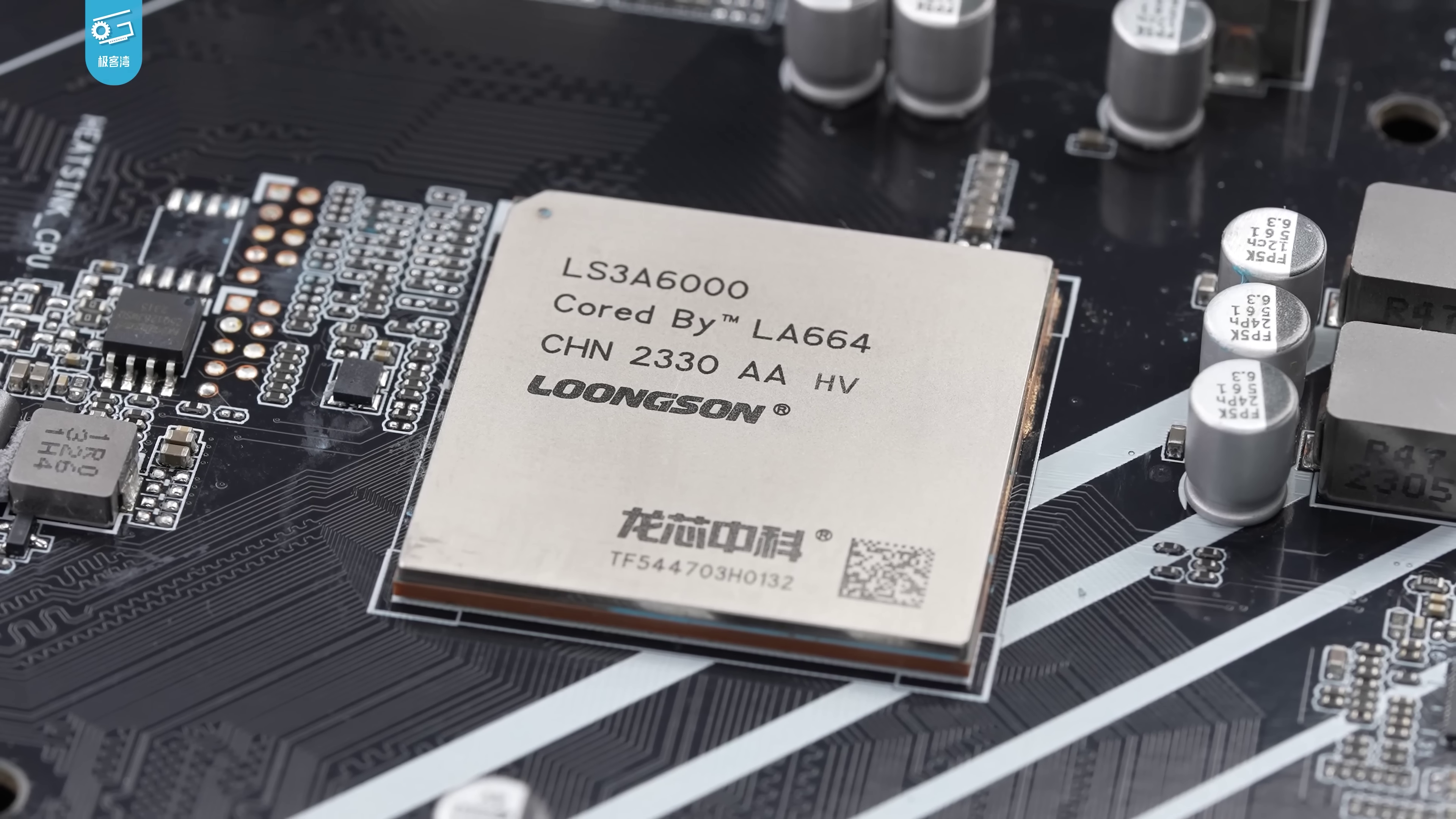
Loongson 3A6000 CPU

In 2022 Loongson announced their 6000 series processors. The company said that the updated processor architecture would use new "LA664" cores and that the single-core performance would rival that of AMD's Zen 3 and Intel's Tiger Lake (11th-generation Core) architecture (launched in 2020).

In November 2023 Loongson debuted the 3A6000 processor. The processor is fabricated using a 14 nm or 12 nm process and supports the fairly old DDR4 standard for memory. The Register reported that Loongson had demonstrated benchmarks suggesting that the 3A6000 processor was competitive with an Intel 10th-generation Core processor (launched in 2019).

According to reports, Loongson's 3C6000 was to become available in the fourth quarter of 2024. The CPU is a monolithic chip with 16 cores; it features the LA664 proprietary MIPS-derived microarchitecture supporting simultaneous multithreading technology (SMT). The 3C6000 processor features four DDR4-3200 memory interfaces. According to reports, the CPU's performance compares to that of Intel's 16-core Xeon Silver 4314 processor, which was released in the second quarter of 2021.

==== 7000 series ====
In 2024, Loongson reportedly began its transition to the 7 nm process, which was said to potentially provide a 20% to 30% increase in performance to the 3A7000 CPU. The 7 nm chips, which could go on sale in 2025, will probably be produced entirely in China, due to US sanctions. In November 2025, an analyst reported that the 3D7000 CPU family would probably go on sale in 2027, use a sub-10 nm process technology and would utilise chiplets with over 32 cores. Loongson was said to have stated that the company had already started the IP design work and that the finished product would include modern technology, e.g. DDR5 and PCIe 5.0.

== Supported software ==
=== Godson ===
==== Operating systems ====
The Godson processors are mainly designed around using the Linux operating system. Any operating system supporting the MIPS architecture should theoretically work. Windows CE was ported to a Godson-based system with minimal effort. In 2010, Lemote ported an Android distribution to the Godson platform.

Godson machines are used in the package-building and CI infrastructure of Debian and Golang, respectively. This is partially because of Loongson's status as the only vendor producing application-grade MIPS CPUs for retail.

==== Compiler support ====
The GNU Compiler Collection (GCC) is the main compiler for software development on the Loongson platform.

Before 2021 LLVM support was still inadequate due to missing workarounds for Loongson's CPU errata on MIPS.

ICT also ported Open64 to the Loongson II platform.

=== LoongArch ===
==== Operating systems ====
As LoongArch is not compatible with MIPS, operating systems have to be ported to work on LoongArch.

Chinese Linux distributions supporting LoongArch include Kylin, Loongnix, Deepin, Unity Operating System, AOSC OS, and Loong Arch Linux. There are efforts to build LoongArch support into community versions of Linux.

Since 2022, OpenHarmony, a Chinese operating system similar to Android, supports LoongArch.

Other common Linux distributions supporting LoongArch include Alpine Linux (since 3.21.0), Debian, Gentoo Linux, Nixpkgs (since 25.11), OpenWrt (since 24.10), and Slackware.

==== Compiler support ====
LoongArch is supported by the GCC, LLVM, Golang and Rust compilers. OpenJDK and .NET ports exist but are not accepted by upstream developers due to U.S. sanctions against Loongson.

== Loongson microprocessor specifications ==
Series	Model	Frequency (MHz)	Architecture	Microarchitecture	Year	Cores	Process (nm)	Transistors (million)	Die size (mm^{2})	Power (W)	Voltage (V)	Cache (KiB)				Peak floating point performance (GFLOPS)	Performance int/fp [SPEC2000] (SPEC2006)	Remarks
Series	Model	Frequency (MHz)	Architecture	Microarchitecture	Year	Cores	Process (nm)	Transistors (million)	Die size (mm^{2})	Power (W)	Voltage (V)	L1(single core)		L2	L3	Peak floating point performance (GFLOPS)	Performance int/fp [SPEC2000] (SPEC2006)	Remarks
Series	Model	Frequency (MHz)	Architecture	Microarchitecture	Year	Cores	Process (nm)	Transistors (million)	Die size (mm^{2})	Power (W)	Voltage (V)	Data	instruction	L2	L3	Peak floating point performance (GFLOPS)	Performance int/fp [SPEC2000] (SPEC2006)	Remarks
Godson	1	266	MIPS-II 32-bit	—N/a	2001	1	180	22	71.4	1.0	Unknown	8	8	—N/a	—N/a	0.6	[19/25]	
Godson	FCR_SOC	266	MIPS-II 32-bit	—N/a	2007	1	180	Unknown	Unknown	Unknown	Unknown	8	8	—N/a	—N/a	0.6	Unknown	
Godson	2B	250	MIPS-III 64-bit	—N/a	2003	1	180	Unknown	Unknown	Unknown	Unknown	32	32	—N/a	—N/a	Unknown	[52/58]	
Godson	2C	450	MIPS-III 64-bit	—N/a	2004	1	180	13.5	41.5	Unknown	Unknown	64	64	—N/a	—N/a	Unknown	[159/114]	
Godson	2E	1000	MIPS-III 64-bit	GS464 (r1) (prototype)	2006	1	90	47	36	7	1.2	64	64	512	—N/a	Unknown	[503/503]	
Loongson 1	1A	300	MIPS32	GS232	2010	1	130	22	71.4	1.0	Unknown	16	16	—N/a	—N/a	0.6	Unknown	
Loongson 1	1B	266	MIPS32	GS232	2010	1	130	13.3	28	0.6	Unknown	8	8	—N/a	—N/a	Unknown	Unknown	
Loongson 1	1C	300	MIPS32	GS232	2013	1	130	11.1	28.3	0.5	Unknown	16	16	—N/a	—N/a	Unknown	Unknown	
Loongson 1	1C101	8	MIPS32	GS132R	2018	1	130	Unknown	Unknown	Unknown	Unknown	—N/a	—N/a	—N/a	—N/a	Unknown	Unknown	
Loongson 1	1D	8	MIPS32	GS132	2014	1	130	1	6	3 × 10^{−5}	Unknown	—N/a	—N/a	—N/a	—N/a	Unknown	Unknown	
Loongson 2	2F	1200	MIPS-III 64-bit	GS464 (r1)	2007	1	90	51	43	5	1.2	64	64	512	—N/a	3.2	Unknown	
Loongson 2	2G	1000	MIPS64	GS464 (r2)	2012	1	65	Unknown	Unknown	Unknown	1.15	64	64	4096	—N/a	Unknown	Unknown	
Loongson 2	2GP	800	MIPS64	GS464 (r2)	2013	1	65	82	65.7	8	1.15	64	64	1024	—N/a	3.2	Unknown	
Loongson 2	2I	800	MIPS64	GS464 (r2)	2013	1	65	82	65.7	8	1.15	64	64	1024	—N/a	3.2	Unknown	
Loongson 2	2H	1000	MIPS64	GS464 (r2)	2012	1	65	152	117	5	1.15	64	64	512	—N/a	4	Unknown	
Loongson 2	2K1000	1000	MIPS64 Release 2 LoongISA 1.0	GS264E	2017	2	40	1900	79	5	1.1	32	32	256 × 2	1024	8	Unknown	
Loongson3	3A1000	1000	MIPS64 Release 2 LoongISA 1.0	GS464 (r2)	2009	4	65	425	174.5	10	1.15	64	64	256 × 4	—N/a	16	[568/788], (2.4/2.3)	
Loongson3	3B1000	1000	MIPS64 Release 2 LoongISA 1.0	GS464 (r2)	2010	4+4	65	＞ 600	Unknown	20	1.15	64	64	128 × 8	—N/a	Unknown	Unknown	
Loongson3	3B1500	1200–1500	MIPS64 Release 2 LoongISA 1.0	GS464V	2012	4+4	32	1140	142.5	30(typical); 60(vector)	1.15–1.35	64	64	128 × 8	8192	150	Unknown	
Loongson3	3A1500-I	800–1000	MIPS64 Release 2 LoongISA 1.0	GS464E	2015	4	40	621	202.3	15	1.15–1.25	64	64	256 × 4	4096	16	(6/??)	
Loongson3	3A2000	800–1000	MIPS64 Release 2 LoongISA 1.0	GS464E	2015	4	40	621	202.3	15	1.15–1.25	64	64	256 × 4	4096	16	(6/??)	
Loongson3	3B2000	800–1000	MIPS64 Release 2 LoongISA 1.0	GS464E	2015	4	40	621	202.3	15	1.15–1.25	64	64	256 × 4	4096	16	(6/??)	
Loongson3	3A3000	1500	MIPS64 Release 2 LoongISA 1.0	GS464E	2016	4	28	＞ 1200	155.78	30	1.15–1.25	64	64	256 × 4	8192	24	[1100/1700], (11/10)@Single (36/33)@Rate	
Loongson3	3B3000	1500	MIPS64 Release 2 LoongISA 1.0	GS464E	2016	4	28	＞ 1200	155.78	30	1.15–1.25	64	64	256 × 4	8192	24	[1100/1700], (11/10)@Single (36/33)@Rate	
Loongson3	3A4000	1800-2000	MIPS64 Release 5 LoongISA 2.0	GS464EV(GS464v)	2019	4	28	?	?	<30 W@1.5 GHz <40 W@1.8 GHz <50 W@2.0 GHz	0.95-1.25	64	64	256 x 4	8192	128	(21.1/21.2)@Single (61.7/58.1)@Rate	
Loongson3	3B4000	1800-2000	MIPS64 Release 5 LoongISA 2.0	GS464EV(GS464v)	2019	4	28	?	?	<30 W@1.5 GHz <40 W@1.8 GHz <50 W@2.0 GHz	0.95-1.25	64	64	256 x 4	8192	128	(21.1/21.2)@Single (61.7/58.1)@Rate	
Loongson3	3A5000 3B5000	2300-2500	LoongArch	GS464V	2021	4	12 / 14			35w @ 2.5 GHz		64	64	256x4	16384	160	(26.6*/??)@Single, (80*/??)@Rate *SpecInt Base point	
Loongson3	3C5000L	2200	LoongArch	GS464V	2021	16	12 / 14			150w @ 2.2 GHz		64	64	256x16	16384x4	560	Unknown	
Loongson3	3C5000L-LL	2000	LoongArch	GS464V	2021	16	12 / 14			125w @ 2.0 GHz		64	64	256x16	16384x4	512	Unknown	
Loongson3	3A6000	2000-2500	LoongArch	LA664	2023	4	12			38w @ 2.5 GHz		64	64	256x4	16384			
Loongson3	3C6000	1800-2300	LoongArch	LA664	2024	16	12								32768			
Loongson3	3D6000	1600-2100	LoongArch	LA664	2024	32	12								65536			
Loongson3	3E6000		LoongArch	LA664	2024	64	12								131072			
Loongson3	3B6600	3000	LoongArch	LA864 + LG200	2025	8	7								16384			
Loongson3	3A7000		LoongArch	LA864	2025	8	7								16384			
Loongson3	3B7000	3500	LoongArch	LA864	2025	16	7								32768			
Loongson3	3C7000		LoongArch	LA864	2025	16	7								32768			
Loongson3	3D7000		LoongArch	LA864	2025	32	7								65536			
Loongson3	3E7000		LoongArch	LA864	2025	64	7								131072			

== Loongson-based systems ==
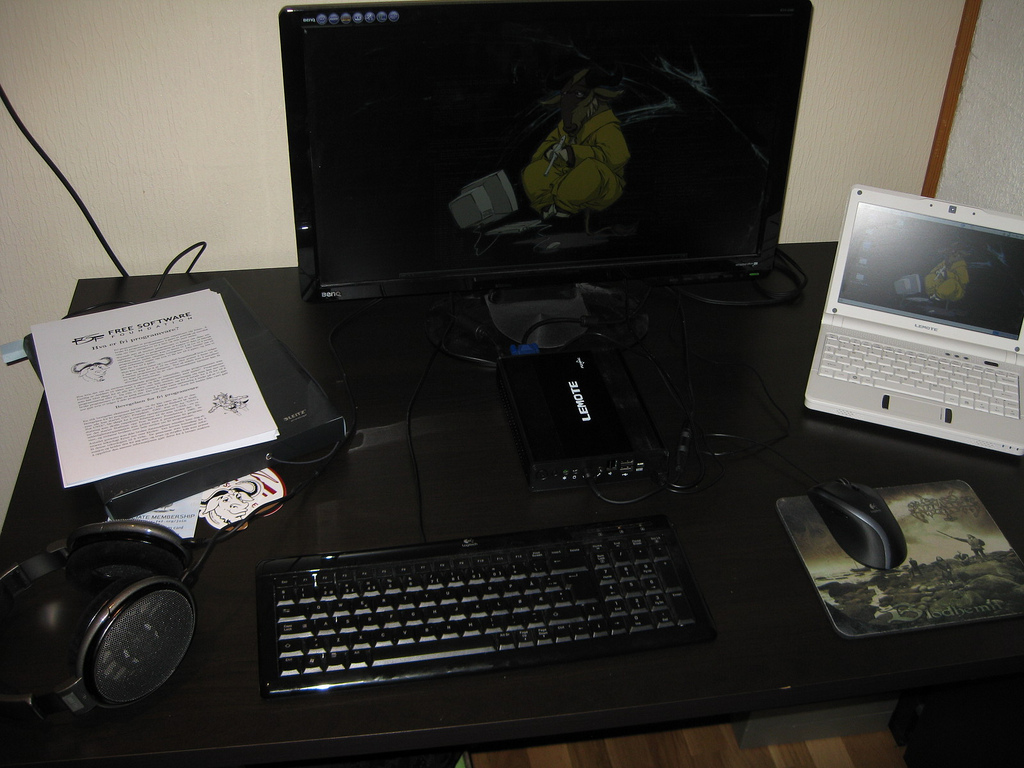
Lemote FuLoong and YeeLoong with a Loongson 2F microprocessor

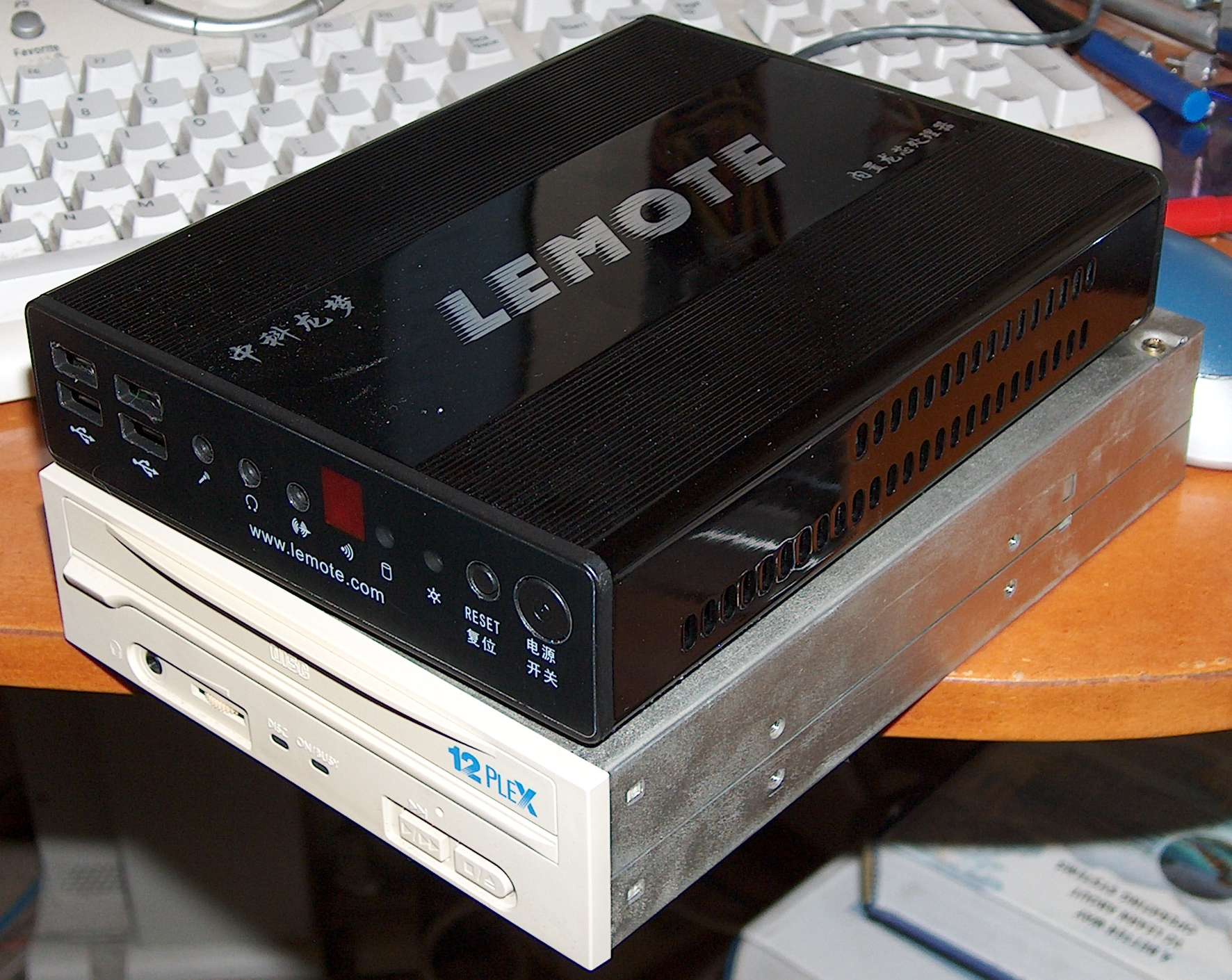
Lemote's Fulong MiniPC on top of a CD-ROM drive as reference

In 2012 it was reported that Loongson processors were found in very few computing systems. The processors are mainly used in Chinese computers; in 2021 it was reported that Loongson supplies CPUs for most desktop computers procured by the Chinese government, and 80% of the Chinese government's servers. The release of the 3A3000 processor in 2015 was noted as turning point for the company's fortunes. In 2017 it was noted that the company's processors were being used in the BeiDou satellite.

=== Personal computers ===
In March 2006, a €100 Loongson II computer design called Longmeng (Dragon Dream) was announced by Lemote.

In June 2006 at Computex'2006, YellowSheepRiver announced the Municator YSR-639, a small-form-factor computer based on the 400 MHz Loongson 2.

As of November 2008 the new 8.9" netbook from the Chinese manufacturer Lemote that replaced mengloong, Yeeloong (Portable Dragon), running Debian, is available in Europe from the Dutch company Tekmote Electronics.

In January 2010, Jiangsu province planned to buy 1.5 million Loongson PCs.

In September 2011, Lemote announced the Yeeloong-8133 13.3" laptop featuring 900 MHz, quad-core Loongson-3A/2GQ CPU.

=== Supercomputers ===
On 26 December 2007, China revealed its first Loongson-based supercomputer in Hefei. The KD-50-I has a reported peak performance of 1 TFLOPS, and about 350 GFLOPS measured by LINPACK. This supercomputer was designed by a joint team led by Chen Guoliang at the computer science technology department of the University of Science and Technology of China (USTC) and ICT (the secondary contractor). KD-50-I is the first Chinese built supercomputer to utilize domestic Chinese CPUs, with a total of more than 336 Loongson-2F CPUs, and nodes interconnected by ethernet. The size of the computer was roughly equivalent to a household refrigerator and the cost was less than RMB800,000 (approximately US$120,000, €80,000).

In 2012 it was reported that Loongson processors were to be found in the Sunway BlueLight MPP and Dawning 6000 supercomputers.

== See also ==
- 863 Program
- Major events in computer science in China
- Semiconductor industry in China
