= China Computer Federation =

Chinese learned society

- 中国计算机学会
- Founded: June 1962
- Type: Professional organization
- Purpose: Computer science
- Location: Beijing, China
- Origins: Computer Professional Committee of China Electronics Society; Computer Society of Chinese Society of Electronics
- Region served: China
- Members: 80,000+
- Key people: Gao Wen (高文) (President)
- Website: www.ccf.org.cn/en/

China Computer Federation
- Simplified Chinese: 中国计算机学会
- Traditional Chinese: 中國計算機學會
Transcriptions
Standard Mandarin
- Hanyu Pinyin: Zhōngguó Jìsuànjī Xuéhuì

The China Computer Federation (CCF) is a professional body and learned society in the field of computer science in China. It was created under the name "Computer Professional Committee of China Electronics Society" (Chinese: 中国电子学会计算机专业委员会) in June 1962. As of 2019, it has 36 specialized committees, 12 working committees and 32 local member activity centers.

== History ==
The China Computer Federation was established in 1962 in China for the purpose of providing services for the academic and professional development of professionals in the field of computer science, promoting the application of academic progress and technological achievements, conducting academic evaluation and leading the academic direction, promoting the exchange and interaction of technology and industrial applications, and recognizing and commending individuals, enterprises and units with outstanding achievements in academic and technological fields. It was forced to close between 1966 and 1979 during the ten-year Cultural Revolution. In January 1979, it was renamed "Computer Society of Chinese Society of Electronics" (中国电子学会计算机学会). In March 1985, its name was changed to "China Computer Federation".

== Scientific publishing ==
- Communication of China Computer Society
- Chinese Journal of Computers

== See also ==
- Major Events in Chinese Computer Science
