= Inspur =

Chinese information technology company

Inspur Group Co., Ltd.

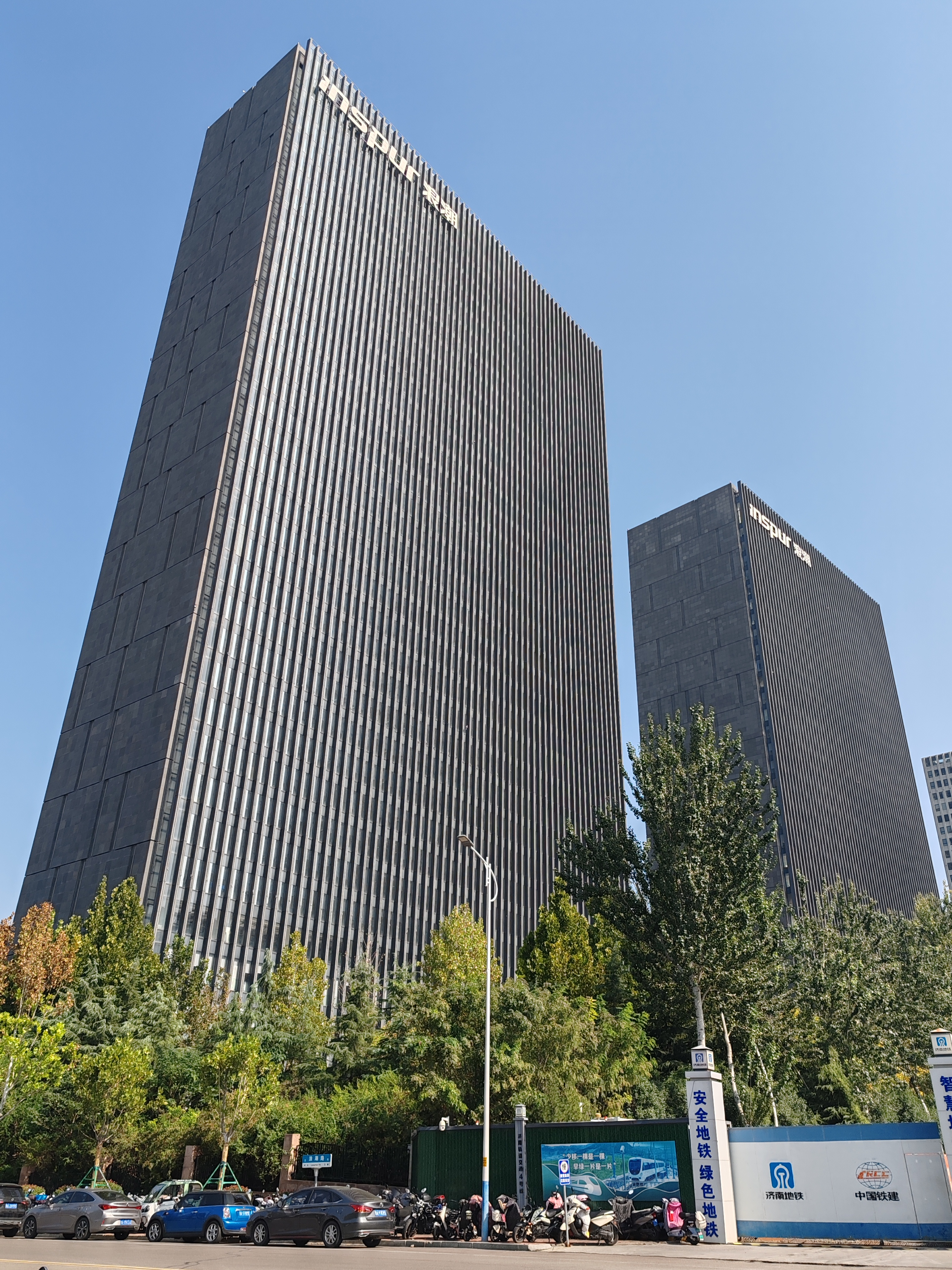
- Headquarter of Inspur in Jinan, Shandong
- Native name: 浪潮集团
- Traded as: SSE: 600756; SZSE: 000977; SEHK: 596; CSI 300
- Industry: Computers, Servers, and software
- Founded: 1983; 43 years ago
- Headquarters: Jinan, China
- Key people: Sun Pishu (Chairman & CEO)
- Products: Cloud Computing, Servers, Storage, Artificial Intelligence
- Revenue: 63.2 billion yuan (2015)
- Subsidiaries: Venezolana de Industria Tecnológica, C.A.
- Website: www.inspur.com

Inspur
- Simplified Chinese: 浪潮集团
- Traditional Chinese: 浪潮集團
Transcriptions
Standard Mandarin
- Hanyu Pinyin: Làngcháo Jítuán

Inspur Group is an information technology conglomerate in the People's Republic of China focusing on cloud computing, big data, key application hosts, servers, storage, artificial intelligence and ERP. On April 18, 2006, Inspur changed its English name from Langchao to Inspur. It is listed on the SSE, SZSE, and SEHK.

== History ==
In 2005, Microsoft invested US$20 million in the company. Inspur announced several agreements with virtualization software developer VMware on research and development of cloud computing technologies and related products. In 2009, Inspur acquired the Xi'an-based research and development facilities of Qimonda AG for 30 million Chinese yuan (around US$4 million). The centre had been responsible for design and development of Qimonda's DRAM products.

In 2011, Shandong Inspur Software Co., Ltd., Inspur Electronic Information Co., Ltd. and Inspur (Shandong) Electronic Information Company, established a cloud computing joint venture, with each holding a third.

=== U.S. sanctions ===
In June 2020, the United States Department of Defense published a list of Chinese companies operating in the U.S. that have ties to the People's Liberation Army, which included Inspur. In November 2020, Donald Trump issued an executive order prohibiting any American company or individual from owning shares in companies that the U.S. Department of Defense has listed as having links to the People's Liberation Army.

In March 2023, the United States Department of Commerce added Inspur to the Bureau of Industry and Security's Entity List. In March 2025, several Inspur subsidiaries were also added to the Entity List, including its Aivres Systems subsidiary.

== See also ==
- Inspur Server Series
