= Institute of Computing Technology =

Chinese research institute

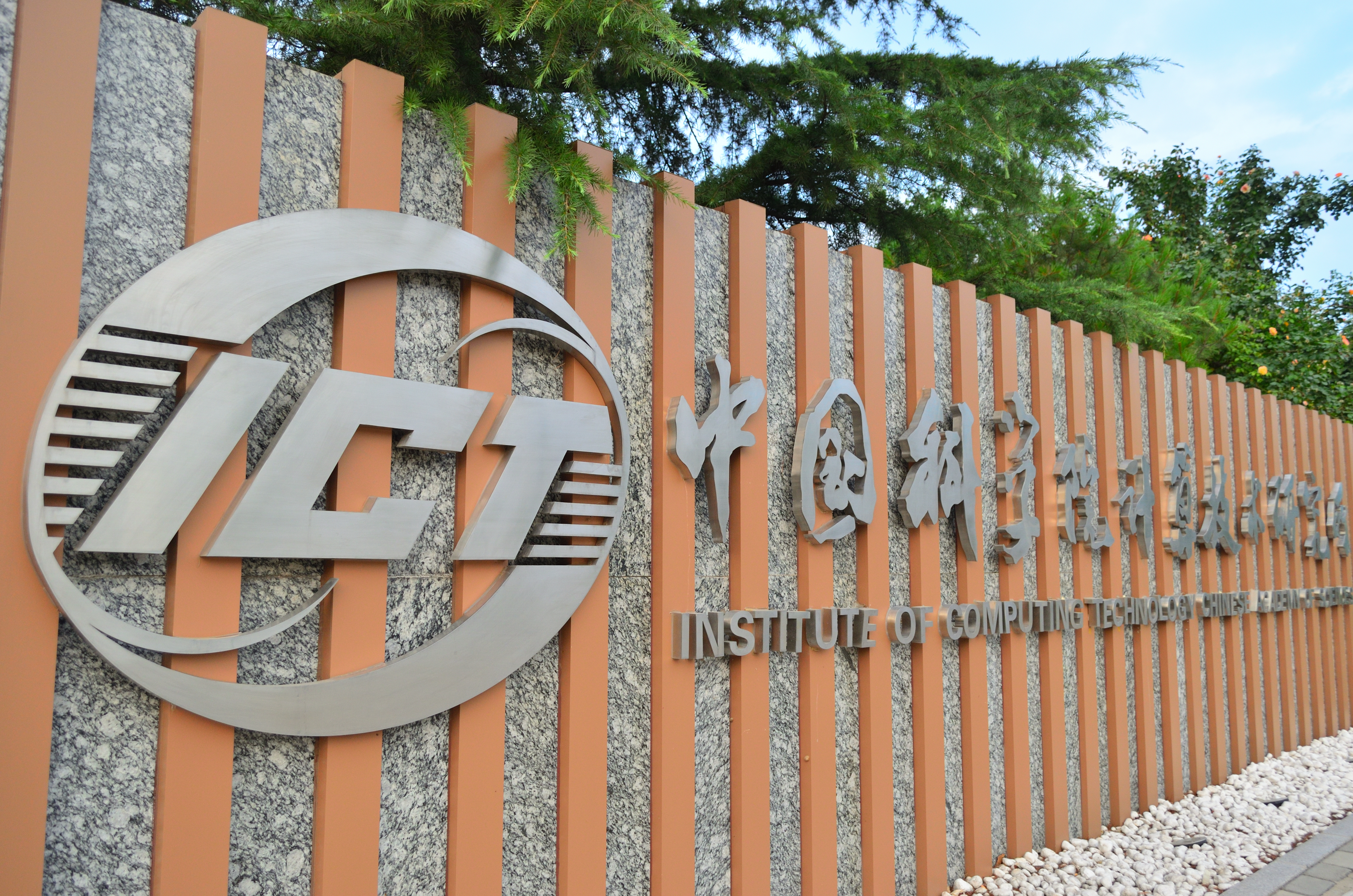
Institute of Computing Technology building entrance

The Institute of Computing Technology (ICT; 中国科学院计算技术研究所) is a research institute under the Chinese Academy of Sciences.

The institute was established in 1956 as China's first specialized institution engaged in computer research. It has developed the first and many other general-purpose digital computers in China, and spin-offed the Institute of Software, Lenovo, Dawning, Loongson, etc.

== History ==
When the Institute of Computing Technology of the Chinese Academy of Sciences was founded in Beijing in 1956, it rented Building 3 of Xiyuan Hotel as a temporary residence for offices and laboratories. It moved to Zhongguancun in February 1958. In the same year, the first general-purpose digital electronic computer of China, the 103, was successfully developed at the institute.

Shortly after the founding of the Institute, in 1960, the Sino-Soviet split forced Chinese computing to continue developing in isolation: the USSR recalled its technical advisers from the country.

=== Model 119 ===
In 1964, ICT successfully produced China's first self-developed large digital computer, the 119. The 119 was a core technology in facilitating China's first successful nuclear weapon test (Project 596), also in 1964.

=== Model 111 & Model 013 ===
By 1972, the Institute, which now comprised 1,000 employees and ten laboratories, had produced the 48-bit Model 111, the first computer built entirely with Chinese-produced integrated circuitry. Speed could reach 180 kiloflops. A visiting delegation of American computer scientists noted with astonishment that the country had succeeded in producing a third-generation computer with virtually no external assistance. In 1976, Model 013 debuted, with 48-bit architecture and 768K core memory. The 013 ran a FORTRAN compiler, a full OS, and "a BCY compiler for a Chinese designated programming language."

The institute is the birthplace of China's first general-purpose CPU chip as well. It is also the R&D base of China's high-performance computers.

In addition, the Institute has successively spun-off several research institutes and high-tech enterprises, including the Institute of Software, Lenovo, Dawning, Loongson and Cambricon.

== Research ==
The mission of the institute is to advance scientific discoveries and technological innovations in computer science and technology, strives to become a world-class research institute, and to contribute to the economic development and social sustainability of China and the world.

There are the research divisions of Microprocessor, Computer System, Network, Data Science and Artificial Intelligence; which in turn owns the national Key Laboratory of Processors, the High Performance Computer Research Center, the Network Technology Research Center (NTRC), the Key Laboratory of Network Data Science and Technology, and the Key Laboratory of Intelligent Information Processing, etc. The institute also hosts the national core journals of Journal of Computer Research and Development (计算机研究与发展, in Chinese), Chinese Journal of Computers (计算机学报, in Chinese) and Journal of Computer Science and Technology.

== Teaching ==
The institute also hosts the School of Computer Science of the University of Chinese Academy of Sciences (UCAS), offering various programs in computer science and technology at undergraduate, master and PhD levels. Since 1960, the institute has cultivated more than 6,000 graduates.

== Address ==
The institute is located at: 6 Kexueyuan Nanlu, Zhongguancun, Haidian, Beijing, China

Email : ictoffice@ict.ac.cn

== See also ==
- China Computer Federation
- Institute of Software, Chinese Academy of Sciences
- Major Events in Chinese Computer Science
