= List of concept- and mind-mapping software =

Concept mapping and mind mapping software is used to create diagrams of relationships between concepts, ideas, or other pieces of information. It has been suggested that the mind mapping technique can improve learning and study efficiency up to 15% over conventional note-taking. Many software packages and websites allow creating or otherwise supporting mind maps.

== File format ==
Using a standard file format allows interchange of files between various programs. Many programs listed below support the OPML file format and the XML file format used by FreeMind.

== Free and open-source ==
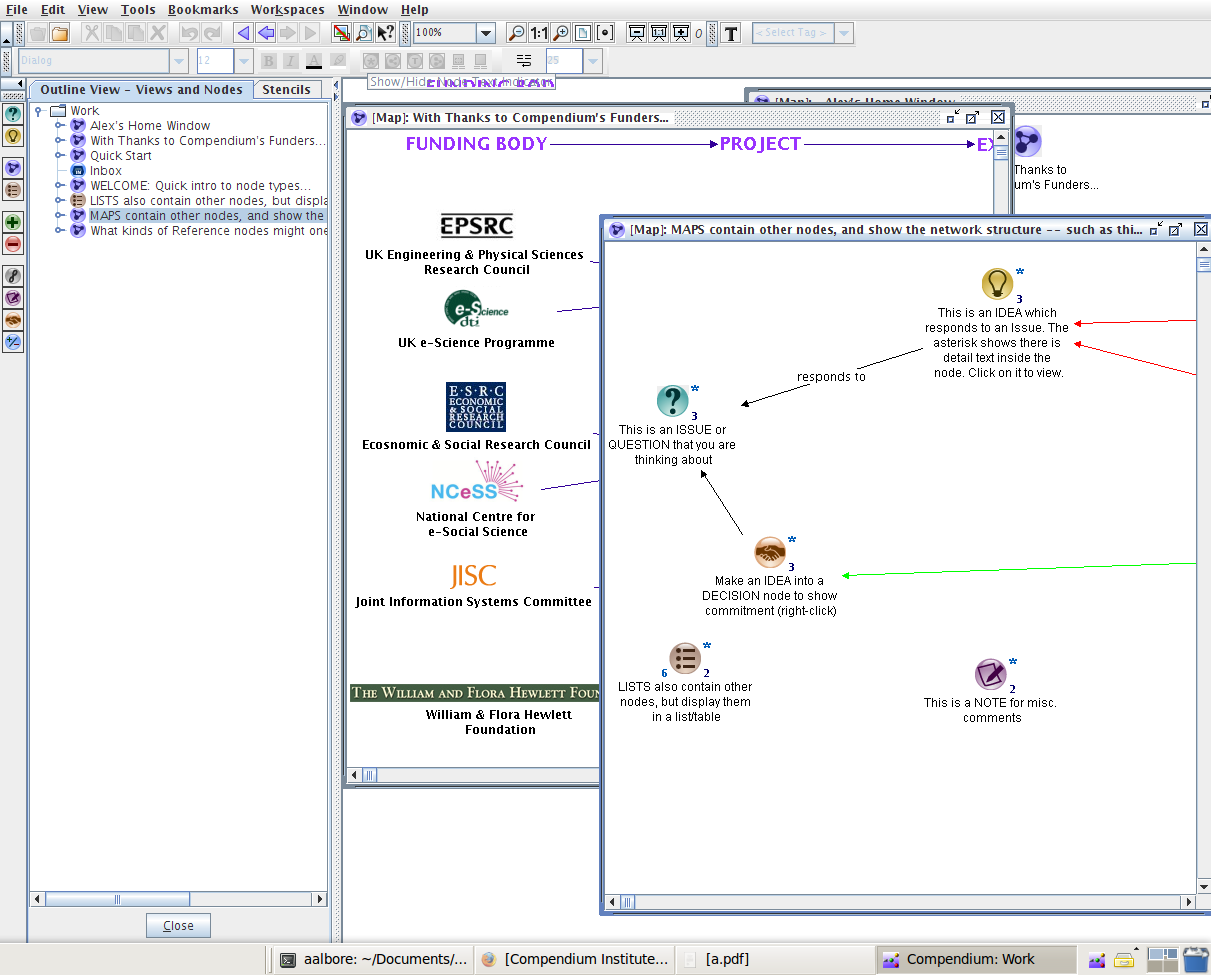
Compendium

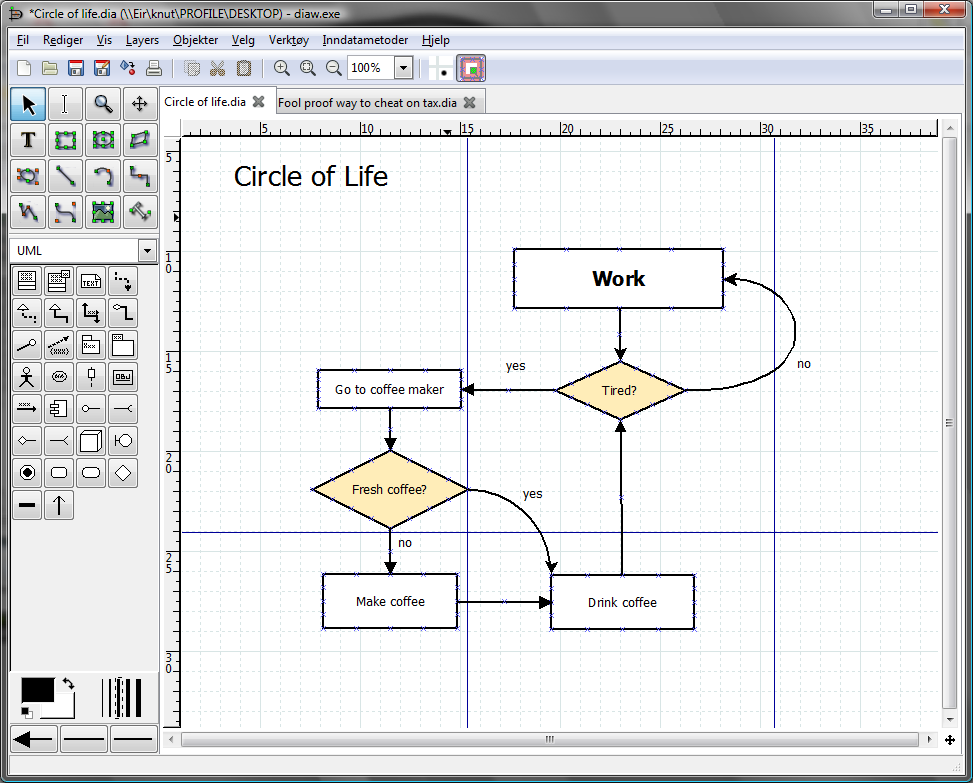
Dia

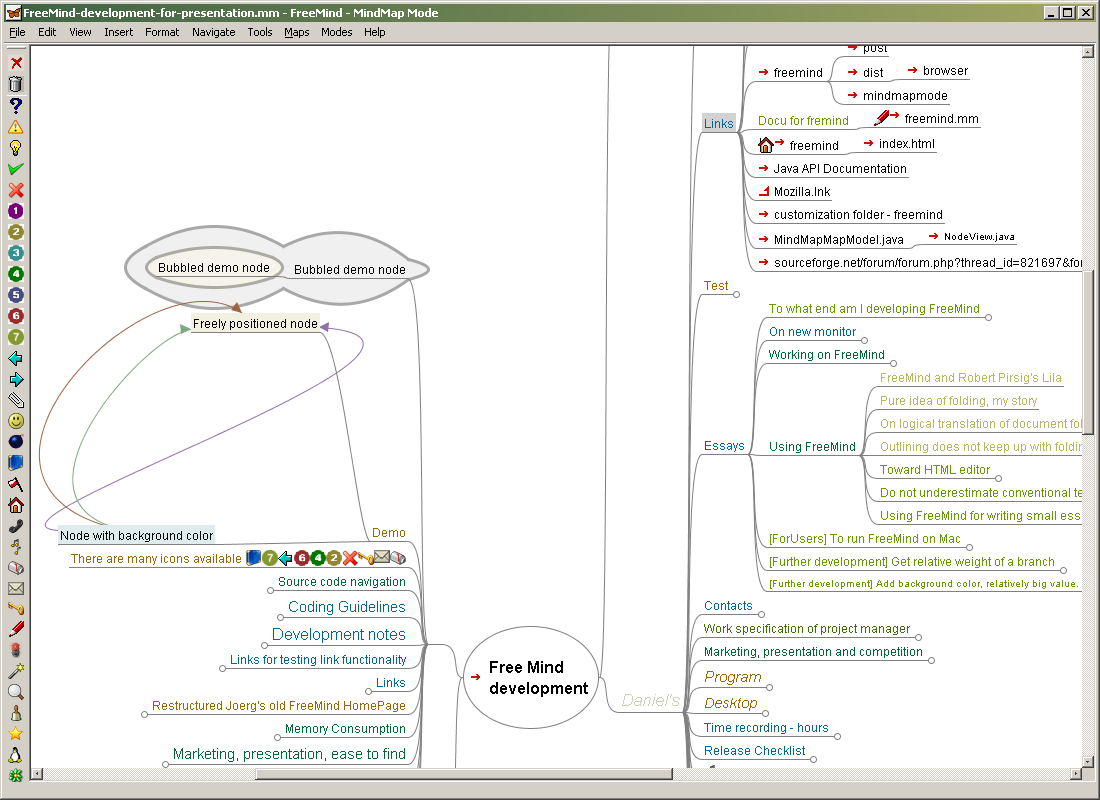
Freemind

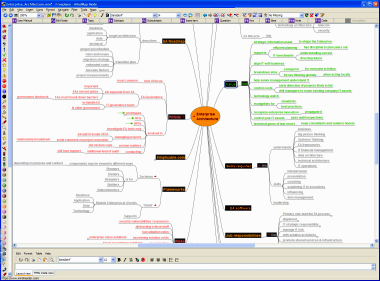
Freeplane

TikZ

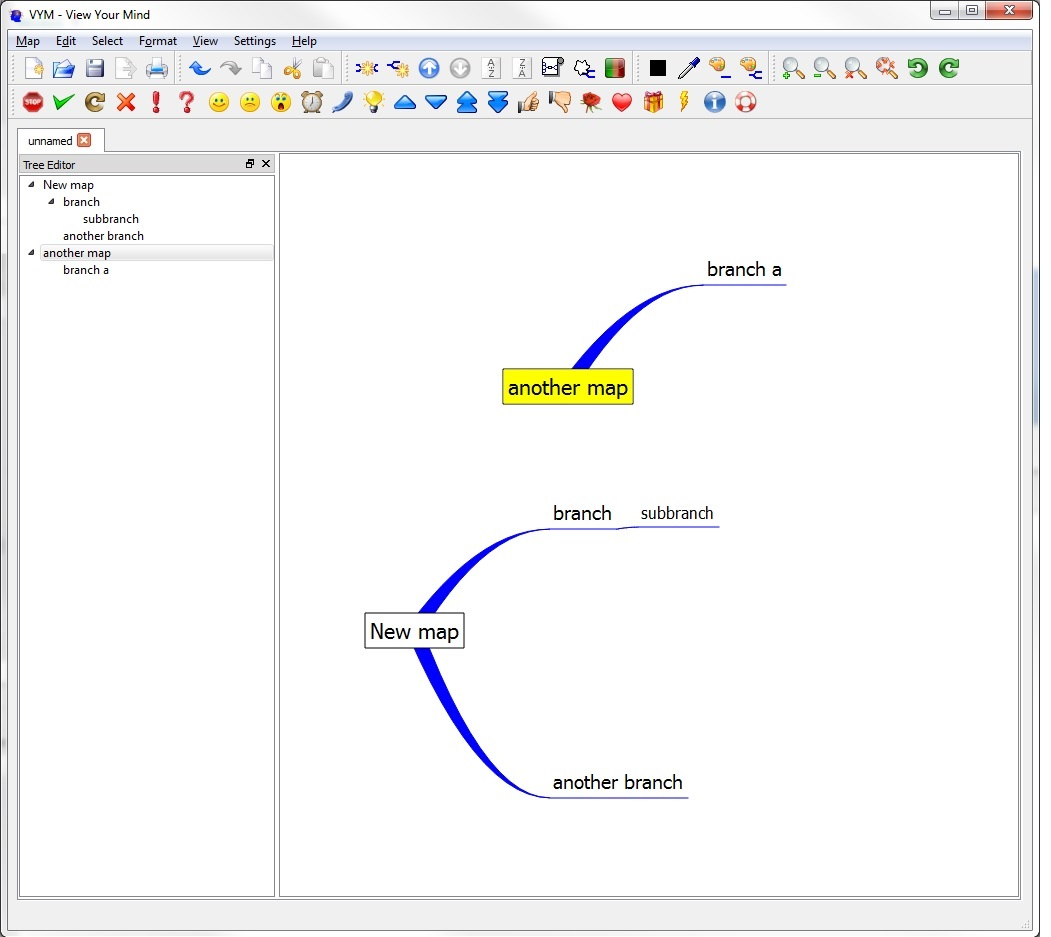
VYM

The following tools comply with the Free Software Foundation's (FSF) definition of free software. As such, they are also open-source software.

Software	License	Genre	Platforms	Online visualization	Online editing	Online real-time collaboration	Written in	Notes
Compendium	GNU GPL	Social science	Cross-platform	No	No	No	Java	An email address is required to receive a download link
Dia	GNU GPL	General purpose	Cross-platform	No	No	No	C.	
diagrams.net (formerly draw.io)	Apache 2	General purpose	Cross-platform	Yes	Yes	Yes	HTML5 JavaScript	Cross-platform graph drawing tool; Supports multiple concept and mind map templates; Supports PlantUML import to SVG image
FreeMind	GNU GPL	Project management	Cross-platform	Yes	No	No	Java	
Freeplane	GNU GPL v2+	Mind mapping	Cross-platform	Yes	No	No	Java	
PGF/TikZ	GNU GPL or LPPL	Mind mapping	Cross-platform	Yes, needs ShareLaTeX	Yes, needs ShareLaTeX	Yes, needs ShareLaTeX	Set of TeX macros; TikZ library: mindmap	
PlantUML	GNU GPL, GNU LGPL, Apache license, EPL, or MIT license	Systems design	Cross-platform	Yes	Yes	No	Java	Can be used to draw various UML diagrams and some others
Visual Understanding Environment (VUE)	Educational Community	Concept mapping	Cross-platform	No	No	No	Java	Can also be used to build presentations
View Your Mind (Open Source)	GPL	Concept mapping	Cross-platform	No	No	No	C++	Uses Qt

== Freeware and other proprietary software ==
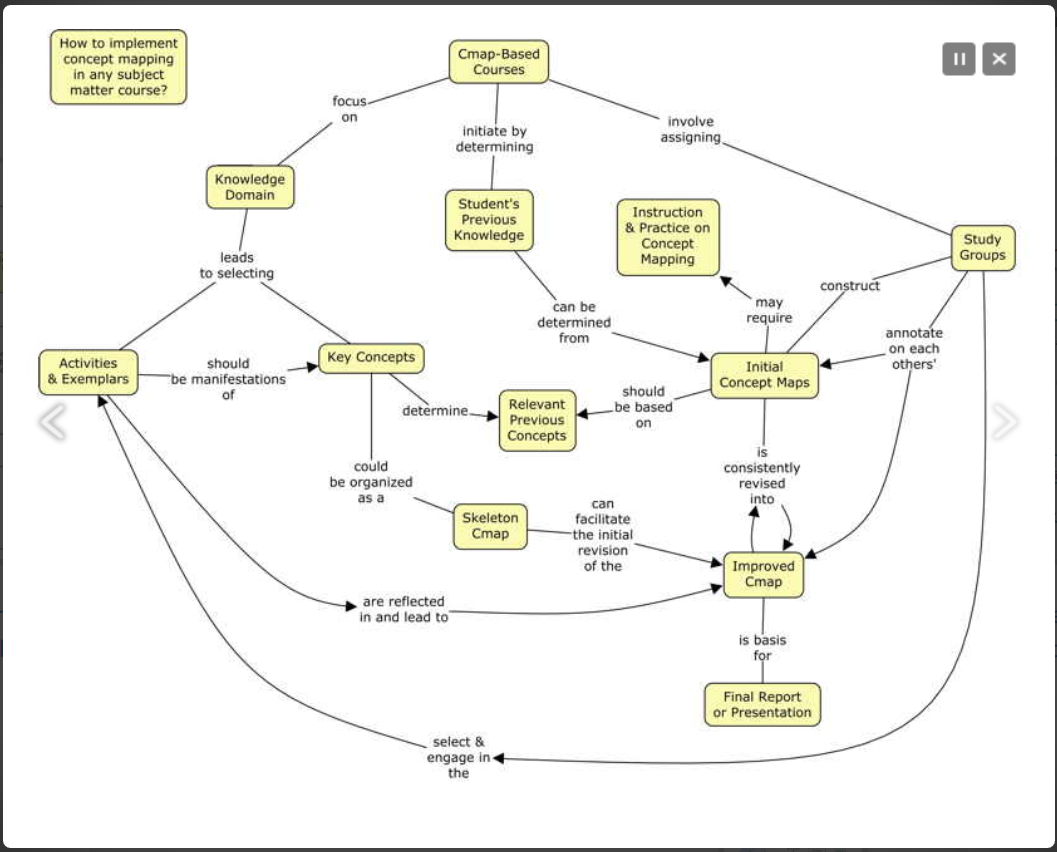
Cmap

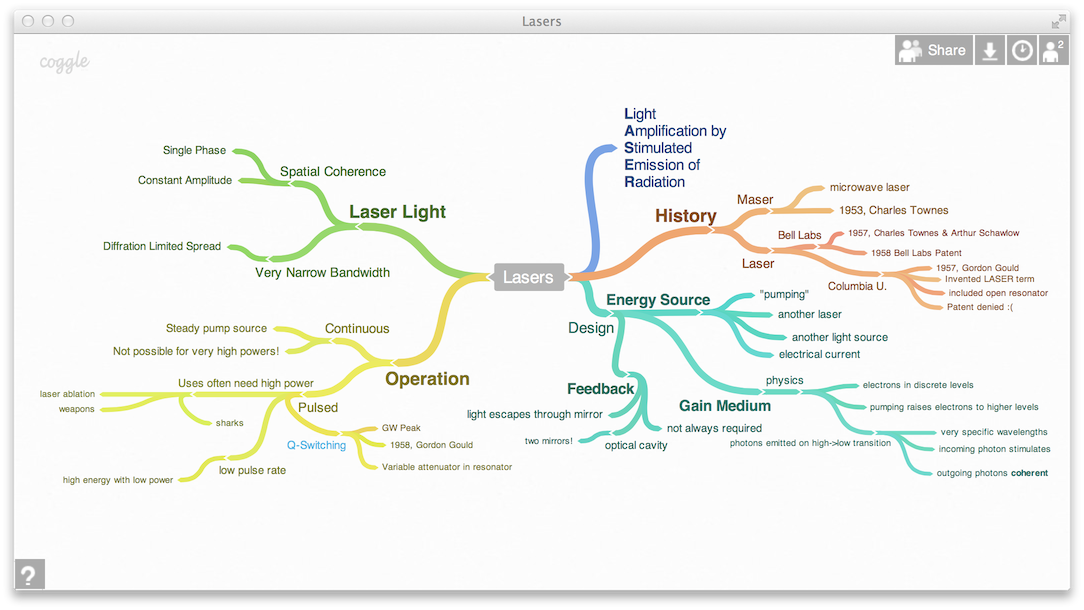
Coggle

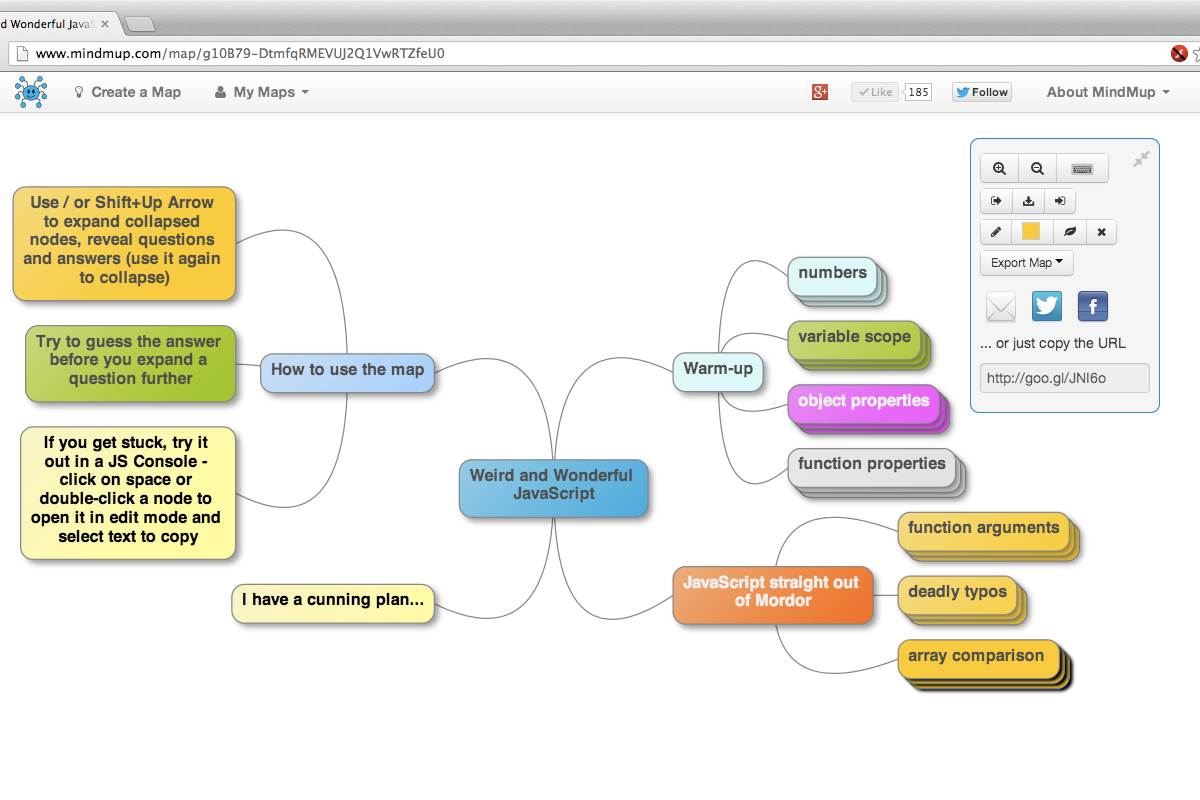
Mindmup

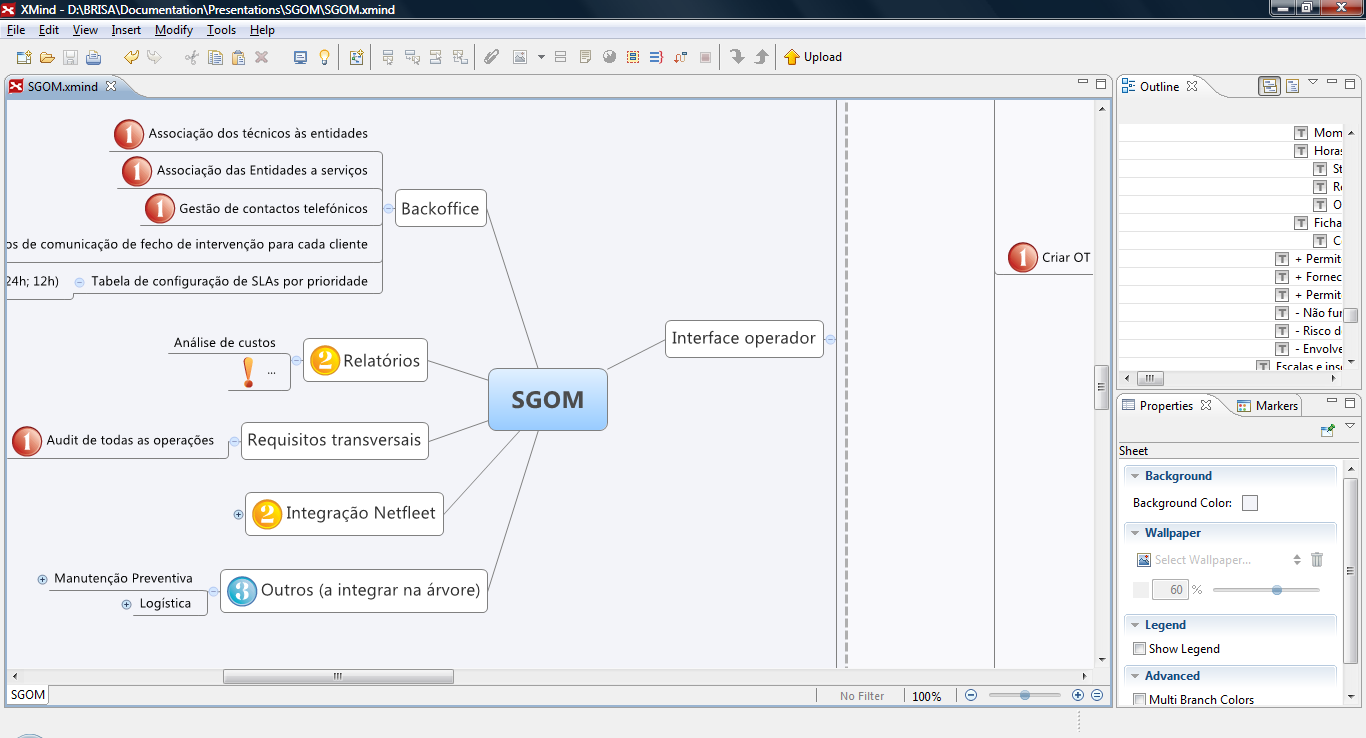
XMind

The following is a list of notable concept mapping and mind mapping applications which are proprietary software (albeit perhaps available at no cost, see freeware).

Software	License	Genre	Platforms	Online visualizing	Online editing	Online real-time collaborating	Written in	Notes
CmapTools	RAND-RF	Concept mapping	Cross-platform	Yes, needs CmapServer, Cmaps on servers generate urls-webpages	Yes, needs CmapServer	Yes, needs CmapServer	Java	Project of Institute for Human and Machine Cognition (IHMC); Allows connections between published concept maps, needs CmapServer
Coggle	Proprietary, freeware, freemium	Mind mapping	Cross-platform	Yes	Yes	Yes	JavaScript, Node.js, jQuery and Backbone.js	Google account needed to log in; Free version lets user save 3 private maps (all others are public)
MindMup	Custom license	Mind mapping	Web browser	Yes	Yes	Yes	HTML5, JavaScript, Ruby	FreeMind import-export; Browser-based, automatically adjusts to mobile (touch) or keyboard interfaces; Integrates with Google Drive and GitHub to provide cloud storage and sharing control
Qiqqa	Proprietary, freeware, freemium	Concept mapping	Windows	Yes	No	No		Mind maps for academics based on their research papers, notes and annotations; Can export mind maps to the web and share by social media
XMind	Proprietary, freeware, freemium	Project management, knowledge management	Windows, OS X, Linux	No	No	No	Java	Mind maps, spreadsheets, fishbone diagrams, tree charts, org charts; Online sharing; Compatible with FreeMind
yEd	Proprietary, yEd	Concept mapping, Mind mapping	Windows, OS X, Linux, cross-platform	?	?	?	Java	General-purpose freeware diagram editor; Can be used to draw different kinds of diagrams: flowcharts, computer network diagrams, UML diagrams, BPMN diagrams, mind maps, organization charts, entity relationship diagrams and many others
Mind42	Proprietary	Mind mapping	Web browser	Yes	Yes	Yes		Browser-based collaborative web application; Real-time collaborative editing; the name Mind42 is intended to be read as Mind for two; Free to use with no function limits; Limited support by developer
SimpleMind	Proprietary (commercial software)							

Software	Developer	Platforms	Notes
3D Topicscape	3D-Scape Limited	Windows	Desktop application that presents mind maps as a 3d scene where each node is a cone; Imports MindManager, Personal Brain, FreeMind, text and folders
ConceptDraw MINDMAP	CS Odessa LLC	Windows, OS X	Desktop mind mapping and brainstorming software, for business, education, or personal activities; Integrates with Microsoft Word, PowerPoint, Project, MindManager, FreeMind and XMind; Compatible with Twitter, Skype and Evernote services
Creately	Cinergix Pvt. Ltd.	Windows, OS X, Linux	Shapes and symbols in libraries; Built-in examples and templates; Export options to PDF, JPEG, PNG, SVG; Cloud collaboration; Video conferencing
Debategraph	Debategraph	Web application	Concept and argument mapping tool
Google Drawings	Google	Web application	Part of Google Docs suite; Vector image editing
LucidChart	Lucid Software, Inc	Web application	HTML5-based collaborative diagramming tool that can be used to map minds and concepts; Android, iPhone, iPad applications, providing offline access to diagrams.
Microsoft Visio	Microsoft	Windows	Part of Microsoft Office product family; Draws static diagrams including block diagrams, organization charts, maps, plans or workflows
MindManager	Mindjet	Windows, OS X, Android	Desktop application comes in basic and pro versions; Integrated with Microsoft Office, available Gantt chart add-in, built-in spreadsheet, Fluent UI
MindMapper	SimTech Systems	Windows	Mind mapping, idea visualizing, brainstorming; Process flow, org charts, fishbone diagrams; Concept maps and flowcharts; Project management with built-in Gantt charts; Built-in presentation; Post it style memo notes; Integrates with Microsoft Office
MindMeister	MeisterLabs GmbH	Windows, OS X, Linux	Browser-based collaborative web application; Android, iPhone, iPad applications, providing access to online mind maps; Built-in chat; Subscription based, also offering a free limited access option
Mindomo	Expert Software Applications	Windows, OS X, Linux	Browser-based; Realtime collaboration, built-in chat, revision history; Built-in presentation mode; Desktop application; Android and iPad applications work both offline and in sync with the cloud; Offers a free limited option
MindView	MatchWare	Windows, OS X, Web application	Integrated with Microsoft Office; 6 Interchangeable views: includes Gantt chart and timeline; Calculation feature and Excel integration; Optimized for project management; Advanced filter function
OmniGraffle	The Omni Group	OS X, iOS	
Prezi	Prezi Inc.	Web application, Windows	Presentation software that supports free form placement and zooming on a single sheet; Offers Android, iPhone and iPad applications work both offline and in sync with the cloud
Qiqqa	Quantisle Ltd.	Windows	Minds maps for academics oriented around their research papers, notes and annotations
Semantica	Semantic Research	OS X, Windows	Family of software to create, view, store and share knowledge structures
SmartDraw	SmartDraw Software, LLC	Windows	Visual processor used to create flowcharts, organization charts, mind maps, gantt charts and other visuals
SpicyNodes	IDEA.org	Adobe Flash	Radial maps, viewer can move from node to node
Tinderbox	Eastgate Systems	OS X	Content management system with concept and mind map abilities
TheBrain	TheBrain Technologies	Windows, OS X, Unix, Unix-like	Graphically intensive and customizable GUI, extremely cross-platform; Notes, calendar, Microsoft Outlook features; Multiple parent node ability
Visual Mind	Mind Technologies	Windows	Supports collaboration (client–server) mode
XMind Pro	XMind Ltd.	Windows, OS X, Linux	Mind mapping, idea visualizing, brainstorming; Built-in presentation; Integrates with Evernote

== See also ==
- Brainstorming
- Graph drawing § Software
- List of Unified Modeling Language tools
- Outliner
- Study software
- Tree structure § Representing trees
