= Vym =

Vym may refer to

- Vym (river), a river in Russia
- vym (software), a mindmap software application
