= 3D Topicscape =

Information management software

- Developer: 3D-Scape Limited
- Stable release: 2.7 / April 2010; 16 years ago
- Operating system: Microsoft Windows
- Type: PIM mind-mapping concept mapping
- License: Commercial; Free Student Edition;
- Website: www.topicscape.com

3D Topicscape is a Personal information manager that provides a template loosely based on mind-mapping or concept mapping. It presents the mind map as a 3D scene where each node is a cone (or pyramid, or variation on such a shape). It can also display in a 2D format. Nodes are arranged in a way that indicates how they are related in much the same way as a mind map. In addition to its use for information management it is claimed to be suitable as a task manager, and for use in project management.

A Topicscape is created by importing folders (by Drag-and-drop or menus), importing from other mind mapping software including FreeMind, PersonalBrain and MindManager or by hand with mouse clicks or keyboard shortcuts. Import sources may be converted to a new Topicscape or added as a portion of an existing one.

The number of levels that can be stored is not limited, but up to seven levels of the hierarchy may be viewed at once. Any node may be chosen as the centre of the 3D scene and choosing one at the edge will cause more to come into view.

Topicscape's most obvious difference from 2D mind mapping software is that it provides a zooming interface and simulates flying as noted by Wall Street Journal columnist Jeremy Wagstaff in his column "Fly through your computer." The BBC World Service and PC World have also reviewed 3D Topicscape.

== Versions ==
- 3D Topicscape public Beta in Jan 2006
- 3D Topicscape 1.0, May 2006
- 3D Topicscape Lite 1.05; 1.07, Dec 2007; 1.2, Aug 2008
- 3D Topicscape Pro 1.2, Feb 2007; 1.3, May 2007; 1.56, Dec 2007; 1.59, May 2008; 1.6, Jul 2008; 1.63, Sep 2008; 2.0, Apr 2009; 2.5 Dec 2009; 2.6 Feb 2010; 2.7 April 2010
- 3D Topicscape Student Edition Beta, Sep 2007; 1.0, Feb 2008; 2.0, Dec 2009

== File Format ==
Uses an embedded Firebird relational database to store user-provided and operational metadata. Files attached to nodes (topics) may be linked to in their original location or be held in a folder (directory) associated with a given Topicscape. Links to files in a Topicscape's folder are relative. Topicscape folders may therefore be moved without breaking such links.

Import file formats supported include FreeMind, OML, MindManager versions 5-8, PersonalBrain, and text (outline-numbered);

Export file formats can be those for FreeMind, OPML, HTML and text structured for re-import, or text for reading.

== See also ==
- Brainstorming
- List of concept- and mind-mapping software
- Personal information managers
- Mind map
