= GitMind =

Web-based mind mapping application

- Developers: WANGXU TECHNOLOGY (HK) CO., LIMITED
- Operating system: Cross-platform
- Platform: Web-based
- Type: Mind mapping, Project management
- License: Proprietary (freeware)
- Website: gitmind.com

GitMind is a web-based mind mapping and diagramming application developed by WANGXU TECHNOLOGY (HK) CO., LIMITED, launched in 2019. GitMind supports the creation of visual diagrams such as mind maps, flowcharts, UML diagrams, organizational charts, Ishikawa diagrams, and entity–relationship diagrams.

In 2021, GitMind introduced mobile applications for iOS and Android platforms. In 2023, GitMind integrated AI features into its platform.

== Features ==
GitMind features include:

- Real-time collaborative editing
- Sharing diagrams through private links
- Templates and customizable styles
- Automatic outline generation from mind maps
- Export options including PNG, JPG, PDF, and TXT
- Compatibility with files from XMind
- Version history with restoration capability

== Compatibility ==
GitMind runs on any modern web browser and is compatible with various operating systems, including Microsoft Windows, macOS, Linux, iOS, and Android.

== See also ==
- Mind map
- Brainstorming
- Flowchart
- Ishikawa diagram
- List of concept- and mind-mapping software
