= MindView =

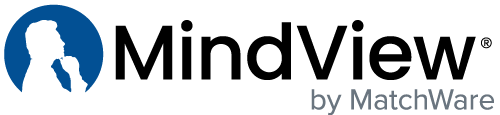

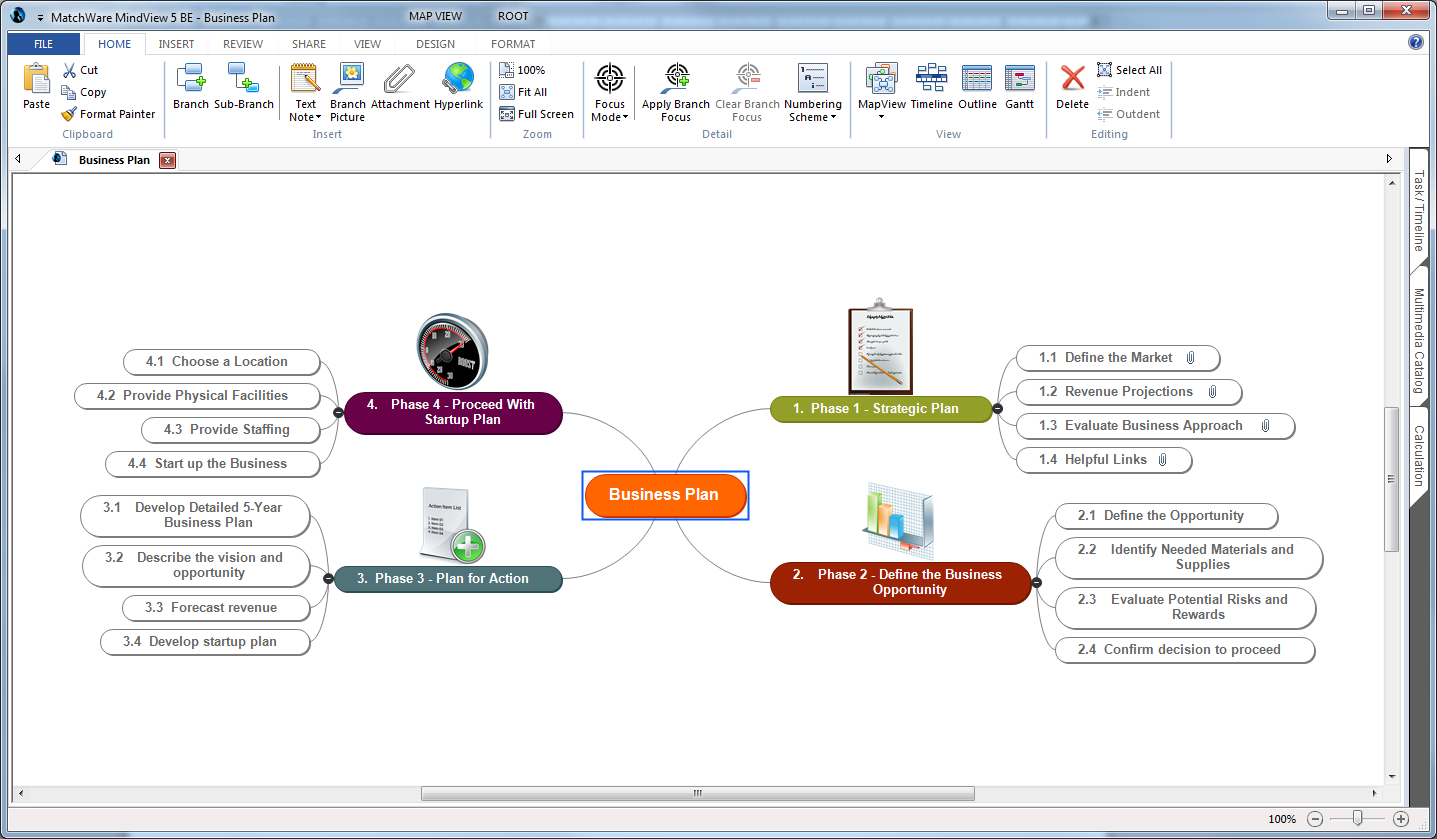
- Developer(s): MatchWare
- Stable release: MindView 8 / August 31, 2020; 4 years ago
- Operating system: Windows, mac OS, online
- Type: mind mapping, Project management
- License: Commercial
- Website: MatchWare.com/mind-mapping-software

MindView is a mind mapping and project management software owned by the company MatchWare. MindView is used for mind mapping, concept mapping, work breakdown structures, timelines, Gantt charts, organizational charts, and other visuals.

== MindView ==
MindView is a visualization tool for mind mapping, concept mapping, work breakdown structures, timelines, Gantt charts, organizational charts, top down estimations, bottom up estimates, and other business visuals. MindView is available as a desktop application for Windows and MacOS, online, or as a web browser extension. Mindview was once called OpenMind, but was renamed for version 3.

MindView also has a Student Edition used at universities. Mindview AT, aimed for academia, includes Assistive Technology (AT) such as text-to-speech, Dragon NaturallySpeaking, predictive text, and audio notes. Mindview was accredited by the Digital Accessibility Center, for individuals with disabilities, including autism.

== Integration and Add-Ons ==
MindView's office integration includes Microsoft Office products, such as Word, PowerPoint, Excel, Outlook, and Project, even Outlook Task Lists. MindView also integrates with online solutions like OneDrive and GoogleDrive. It can import to and from Microsoft Word, PowerPoint, Project, Excel, and Outlook, as well as the ability to export PDF, HTML, and XML. As it allows the import from XML, one may be able to import from other mind mapping tools such as FreeMind or MindManager.

== Awards ==
- Editor's Choice award from PCMag 2011, 2013
- 5 star award from Tucows
- Certificate of Accreditation from Digital Accessibility Centre, 2016
- BETT award nomination

== See also ==
- List of mind mapping software
- Mind map
- Gantt chart
