= SimpleMind =

- Developer(s): ModelMaker Tools
- Initial release: 2009; 16 years ago
- Operating system: Windows, macOS, Android, iOS
- Type: Mind mapping
- License: Proprietary commercial software
- Website: simplemind.eu

SimpleMind is a commercial mind mapping software application developed by ModelMaker Tools. The software provides ways for users to visualize information in mind maps and flowcharts. SimpleMind can be used to manage projects, organize information, and for brainstorming.

== See also ==
- List of concept- and mind-mapping software
- Mind mapping
- Visual thinking
