= Visual Understanding Environment =

Concept mapping application

VUE
- Developer: Academic Technology group at Tufts University
- Initial release: July 20, 2005
- Stable release: 3.3.0 / October 8, 2015
- Written in: Java
- Operating system: Cross-platform
- Available in: English, French, Portuguese, Greek, Italian. Partial translations: Bulgarian, Chinese, German, Hungarian, Russian, Spanish.
- Type: Concept Mapping software
- License: ECL
- Website: vue.tufts.edu
- Repository: github.com/VUE/VUE

The Visual Understanding Environment (VUE) is a free, open-source concept mapping application written in Java. The application is developed by the Academic Technology group at Tufts University. VUE is licensed under the Educational Community License. VUE 3.0, the latest release, was funded under a grant from the Andrew W. Mellon Foundation. As of 2026, VUE has not received an update since October 2015.

== Background ==
The VUE project at Tufts UIT Academic Technology focuses on creating flexible tools for managing and integrating digital resources to support teaching, learning, and research. VUE provides a flexible visual environment for structuring, presenting, and sharing digital information. Using VUE's concept-mapping interface, faculty and students design semantic networks of digital resources drawn from digital libraries and local and remote file systems.

VUE builds on two theories of learning: constructivism, which holds that students learn more effectively when actively engaging with information rather than passively receiving it, and cognitive load theory, which informed the application's approach to managing the limits of working memory. As a research platform, VUE has supported experimental interfaces including a semantic fisheye-zooming prototype.

== Releases ==
Tufts University's VUE development team has coordinated releases of the VUE project. The project's most recent release, VUE 3, has added many new features which distinguish it from traditional concept mapping tools. made by the VUE team on their forums, new features include: tools for dynamic presentation of maps, map merge and analysis tools, enhanced keyword tagging and search capabilities, support for semantic mapping using ontologies, expanded search of online resources such as Flickr, Yahoo, Twitter, or PubMed.

Release	Date
VUE 3.3.0	8 Oct 2015
VUE 3.2.2	23 May 2013
VUE 3.1.1	16 March 2011
VUE 3.0.2	1 July 2010
VUE 3.0	3 February 2010
VUE 2.3.1	6 May 2009
VUE 2.2	20 June 2008
VUE 2.0	10 April 2008
VUE 1.4	20 July 2005

== See also ==
- List of concept- and mind-mapping software
