= Coggle =

Mind mapping application

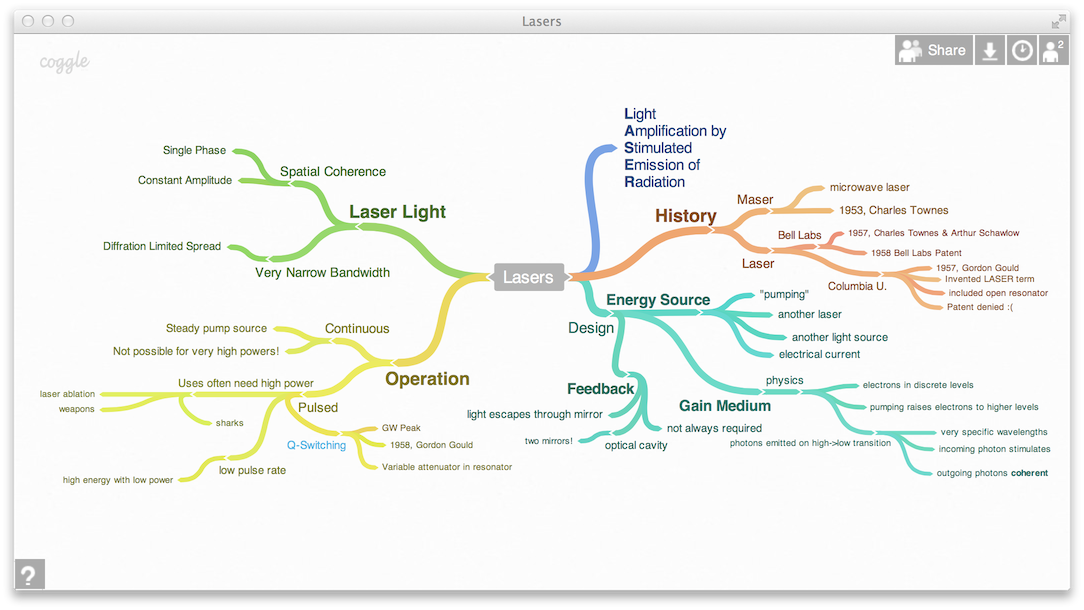
- An example of a Coggle
- Developer: Coggle
- Available in: English, French, Russian, Spanish, Portuguese
- Type: Collaborative software
- License: Freeware software as a service
- Website: coggle.it

Coggle is a freeware mind mapping web application. Coggle produces hierarchically structured documents, like a branching tree. This contrasts with other collaborative editors, like Google Docs, which provide either linear (text document), or tabular (spreadsheet) document formats.

Its authors promise that it will be "free forever" although some features require a paid subscription.

== Features ==
Some of Coggle's notable features:

- Real-time collaboration
- Sharing with organisations, individuals, or by private link
- View and copy previous versions
- Images
- Links
- Multiple root items
- Joining branches
- Comments on items
- Markdown text formatting
- LaTeX math support using MathJax
- iOS support
- Android support

== Supported file formats ==
Coggle supports export to PNG image and vector PDF formats, and import from plain-text outlines. There is also support for importing or exporting to the common FreeMind file format.

== Reception ==
Coggle was voted among the top-5 mind-mapping applications by the readers of Lifehacker in April 2013, three months after the website was first registered.

Coggle has had a strong reception among the education community, praised for its simplicity and ease of use compared to other mind-mapping software.

PC World has criticized the visually simple user-interface for hiding too many elements, making advanced feature discovery difficult.
