= XMind =

Mind-mapping software

History
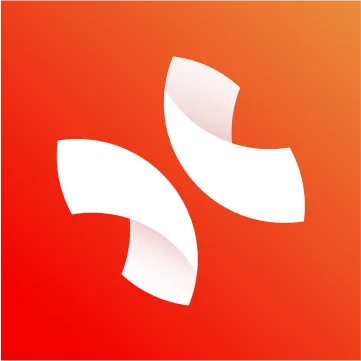

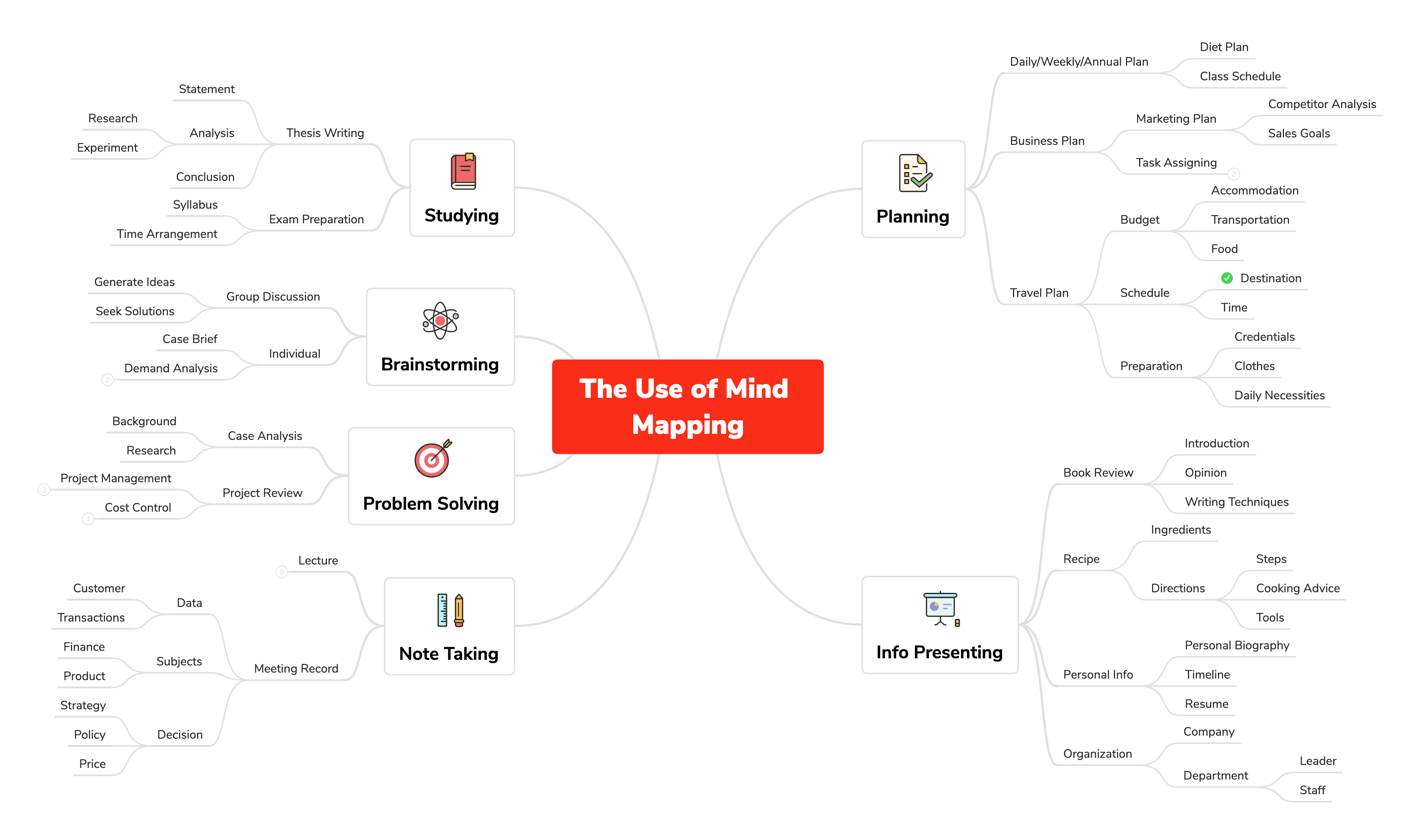
- Developer: XMIND LTD.
- Stable release: Xmind 24.07
- Operating system: Windows, macOS, Linux, iOS, iPadOS, Android, Web
- Type: Productivity software, mind map, project management and knowledge management
- License: Commercial license
- Website: www.xmind.com

Xmind is a mind mapping and collaboration application that incorporates artificial intelligence (AI) features. Its primary functions are to facilitate brainstorming, organize information visually, and support project management and team sharing. As of April 2013, Xmind was selected as the most popular mind mapping software on Lifehacker.

The software is available for macOS, Windows, Linux, iOS, iPadOS, VisionOS, and Android, and a version is also offered for the Web.

The application includes AI tools for functions like content generation and task planning. Collaboration features allow users to share and work on projects with other team members.

== Milestones ==
=== Eclipse-based application and open-sourced ===
Prior to XMind 8 (included), the application is based on Eclipse Rich Client Platform 3.4 for its shell and Eclipse Graphical Editing Framework for its core editors. It depends on Java Runtime Environment 5.0 and later.

Year and month	Milestones	Remark
2007.01	XMIND 2007	-
2007.09	XMIND 2008	-
2008.12	XMind 3	Core code open-sourced.
2012.09	XMind 2012	-
2013.12	XMind 2013	-
2014.11	XMind 6	-
2015.11	XMind 7	-
2016.11	XMind 8	-

=== Electron-based application ===
Starting from XMind: Zen, the application had switched to Electron, a software framework.

Year and month	Milestones	Remark
2018.01	XMind: Zen	Product completely rewrote with Electron.
2020.03	XMind 2020	XMind 2020 replaced XMind 8 as the flagship version.
2020.09	XMind.works	The web edition of Xmind
2021.05	XMind 2021	-
2022.03	Xmind 2022	-
2023.12	Xmind AI	Online AI mind mapping with collaboration
2024.03	Xmind 2024	-
2024.09	Xmind 2024	Collaboration between desktop and online versions.

== Company ==
Xmind is a mind mapping and brainstorming software developed by Xmind Ltd., a company founded in 2007. In 2022, the company established Supermind Pte. Ltd. as its headquarters in Singapore.

The software has been downloaded over 100 million times in more than 190 countries and regions.

== Awards ==
- XMIND 2008 won the "Best Commercial RCP Application" award at EclipseCon 2008
- XMIND 3 won "The Best Project for Academia" award at SourceForge.net Community Choice Awards
- XMIND was picked by PCWorld for inclusion in Productivity Software: Best of 2010
- XMind 2013 was picked as "the Most Popular Mind Mapping Software" on Lifehacker
- XMind won "Red Herring Asia Top 100"
- XMind was rated as "The Best Brainstorming and Mind-Mapping Tech Tool" on lifehack
- XMind was featured in Apple's App Store as "App of the Day" in March, 2018.

== File format ==
Xmind saves content in an Xmind Workbook file format. The .xmind format suffix is used.

An Xmind workbook may contain more than one sheet, as in spreadsheet software. Each sheet may contain multiple topics, including one central topic, multiple main topics and multiple floating topics. Various structures can be inserted in one mind map, allowing the mind map to visualize information in different ways.

The latest .xmind file format implementing Xmind Workbooks consists of a ZIP compressed archive containing an JSON document for contents, a .png image file for thumbnails, and some directories for attachments. The file format is open and based on some principles of OpenDocument/OfficeOpenXML.

== See also ==
- Mind map
- Brainstorming
- List of concept- and mind-mapping software
- Tony Buzan
- Fishbone diagram
- List of Eclipse-based software
