= Adžić =

- Language: Serbo-Croatian

Adžić (Serbian Cyrillic: Аџић) is a Serbo-Croatian surname. It may refer to:

- Blagoje Adžić (1932–2012), Yugoslav People's Army general
- Dragan Adžić, Montenegrin handball player and coach
- Dara Bubamara (born Radojka Adžić, 1976), Serbian singer
- Ivan Adžić, Serbian footballer
- Luka Adžić, Serbian footballer
- Željko Adžić, Croatian footballer
- Gojko Adzic, Serbian consultant and author of Specification by Example
- Jelena Adzic, Canadian journalist and on-air personality
