= Freeplane =

Free mind mapping application

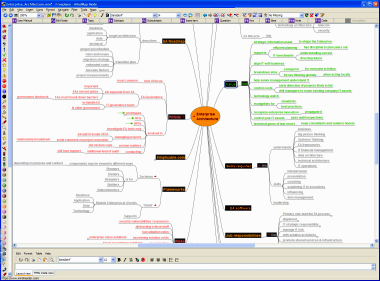
- Screenshot of Freeplane 1.1.3
- Developers: Dimitry Polivaev, et al.
- Stable release: 1.12.18 (February 10, 2026; 7 months ago) [±]
- Operating system: Cross-platform
- Platform: Java
- Type: Mind Mapping
- License: GPL version 2 or later
- Website: docs.freeplane.org
- Repository: github.com/freeplane/freeplane

Freeplane is a free, open source software application for creating mind maps (diagrams of connections between ideas), and electronic outlines. Written in Java, it is supported on Windows, Mac OS X and Linux, and is licensed under the GNU GPL version "2 or later".

In 2007, Freeplane was forked from the FreeMind project. Freeplane maintains partial file format compatibility with FreeMind, fully supporting the FreeMind XML file format, but adds features and tags not supported by FreeMind, which FreeMind ignores on loading.

== Features ==
=== Release 1.1 ===
New features of Freeplane stable release (June 2010) include:

- Export to PNG, JPEG, SVG (in addition to HTML / XHTML and PDF)
- Find / Replace in all open maps
- Paste HTML as node structure
- Outline mode
- Portable version (run from a USB flash drive)
- Scripting via Groovy
- Spell checker

=== Release 1.2.x ===
The first stable Freeplane 1.2.x was 1.2.20 released on October 20, 2012. It includes the following new features:

- Text-processor-like node styles
- Conditional node styles
- Map templates for new maps
- Formatting panel
- Add-ons: Installable enhancements
- Hyperlinks for menu items
- Keyboard shortcut documentation: Map and HTML table generation added for the documentation map
- Check for newer auto save files on opening of a map
- Single instance mode: open files in existing program instance instead of opening a new one.
- Node level dependent filters
- Improvement in search and replace functions
- Different cloud shapes
- New icons for rating
- Automatic Edge Color
- "Grid" for moving of nodes (Preferences->Behaviour->Grid gap size)
- Copy and paste attributes
- Named filter conditions
- Different shapes, line types, width and transparency for connectors
- Freeplane portable version (download and install file named FreeplanePortable_xxx.paf.exe)
- File -> Properties... dialog showing facts about the map such as total nodes, branches and leaf nodes
- New icons added to facilitate speedy use of main and contextual menus
- Formulas: Use of formulas as node text and attributes (like in spread sheet processors)
- Node numbering and Formats/templates as style attributes
- Added progress icons to show incremental completion in 10% or 25% steps
- Summaries: Create graphical and textual summaries by "bracketing" nodes. See example map
- Menu and command structure refactored both to integrate new features and to make Freeplane more intuitive and easier to learn
- Dates and numbers: Parsing and formatting improved
- Digital post-its: free positionable and free floating nodes.
- Dates and numbers: Improved scripting support

=== Release 1.3.x ===
Version 1.3 was published ((date)). New features of 1.3.x included:

- Expand LaTeX feature to both formulae and text
- Integration of OpenStreetMap

=== Release 1.5.x ===
New features of Freeplane 1.5 include:

- New options for creating mind maps with high homogeneity and symmetry
- Clones
- Init scripts
- Background images

=== Release 1.6.x ===
- References to other mind maps from formulas and scripts
- PDF and SVG exports enhancements
- Java 9 support
- JLatexMath update
- Bug fixes

=== Release 1.7.x ===
- Dark UI mode support (Look and feel and map template "Darcula")
- User interface enhancements
- Nodes and aliases enhancements
- Java 13 support, Java 11 compatibility, Java 7 support dropped, Java 8 is required
- Bug fixes

=== Release 1.12.x ===
The latest stable release is 1.12.18 (February 10, 2026; 7 months ago) [±].

== Add-ons ==
One feature of Freeplane is the support for installable enhancements. Add-ons are a way to extend and customize Freeplane similar to how plug-ins and extensions can be used to extend and customize well-known applications like Firefox or LibreOffice. Freeplane add-ons can be used to provide a single function, a bundle of multiple functions, bind those functions to a menu item, etc.

Available add-ons include :

- GTD support
- Study planner
- Versioning and collaborative work

== See also ==
- Mind map
- List of mind mapping software
