= Mind42 =

- Website type: Mind mapping
- Available in: English
- Owner: IRIAN Solutions
- Website: mind42.com
- Commercial: No
- Registration: Required
- Current status: Active
- Content license: Proprietary

Mind42 is an online mind mapping application that allows users to visualize their thinking using the proven mind mapping method. The name refers to the collaborative features of the product, and is intended to be pronounced like "mind for two." It has been recommended by Freelance Weekly as one of their favorite time-management and organization tools.

== Features ==
The developer provides the full feature set of Mind42 free of charge, including:

- Ability to insert images from URLs (i.e. images hosted at another site, such as ImageShack or Picasa Web Albums);
- URL links to external websites;
- Real-time collaboration and editing, utilizing the Google Talk gadget;
- Mind map size limited only by available RAM and processing power;
- The optional ability to publicly publish mind maps or keep them private;
- The ability to add notes to branches;
- Export to Freemind, Mindmanager, Mind42 XML, PDF, image and rich text;
- Import from Freemind, Mindmanager, Mind42 XML.

== Criticisms ==
Criticisms of Mind42 include the lack of offline editing ability, the lack of a mobile version and the limitation that only creators of mind maps, but not collaborators, can view and restore previous revisions of a mind map.

== See also ==
- Cognitive map
- Concept map
- Brainstorming
- List of mind mapping software
