= Gojko Adžić =

Serbian writer

- Born: Belgrade
- Website: https://gojko.net

Gojko Adžić is a software delivery consultant and author of several books on Serverless computing, Impact Mapping, Specification by example, Behavior Driven Development, Test Driven Development and Agile Testing. Adžić is a prolific speaker at software development and testing conferences.

He is one of the 2019 AWS Serverless Heroes, the winner of the 2016 European Software Testing Outstanding Achievement Award, and the 2011 Most Influential Agile Testing Professional Award. Adžić's blog won the UK Agile Award for the best online publication in 2010. His book, "Specification by Example", won the 2012 Jolt Award for the best book and was listed as the second most influential agile book for 2012 based on Amazon and Goodreads reviews.

Adžić was born in Belgrade, Serbia. He attended the Belgrade Mathematical Gymnasium and studied Computer Science at the Faculty of Mathematics at University of Belgrade, Serbia. His professional writing career started in 1997 with computer programming articles published in Serbian computer magazines including PC Press and Mikro-PC World. From 1999 to 2003 he was an associate editor at Mikro-PC World responsible for Linux, and from 2003 to 2005 he served as editor-in-chief. In 2005, he moved from Serbia to the UK to start Neuri Limited and currently works as a partner at Neuri Consulting. In 2013, he co-founded MindMup, an online mind mapping application.
