= Mindomo =

Online collaborative mind mapping software

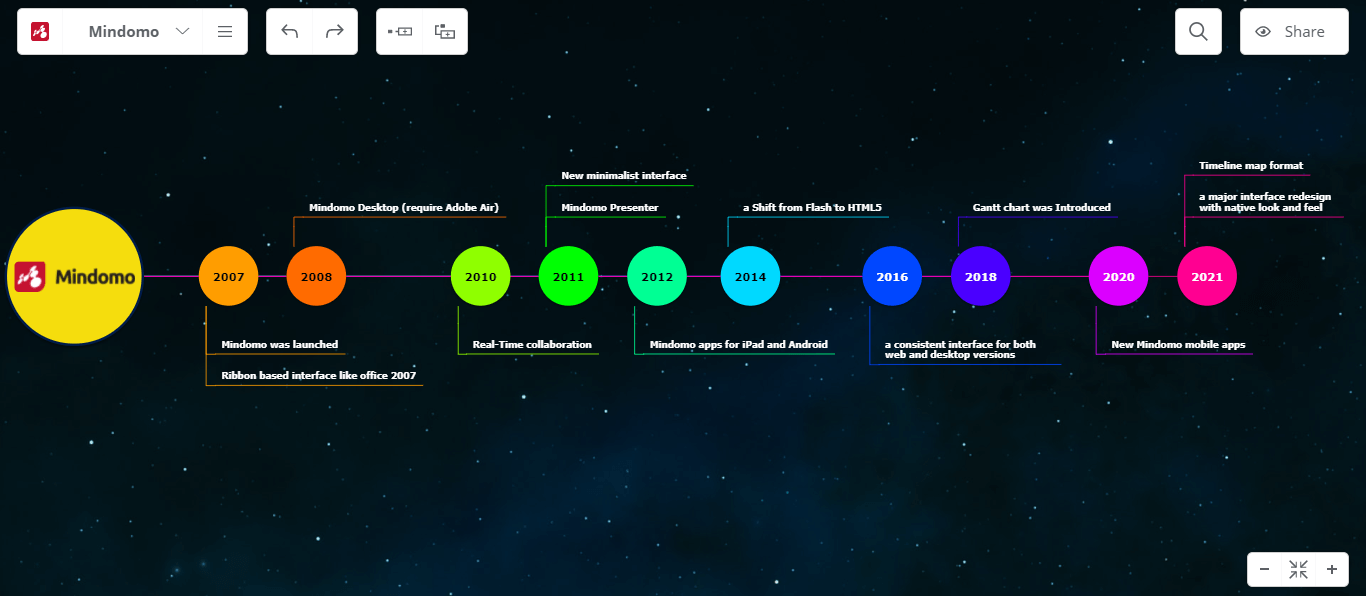
- Mindomo Editor
- Developer: Expert Software Applications
- Release: 2007
- Stable release: v.10.4.6 / 2022
- Operating system: Any
- Platform: HTML5
- Type: Mind mapping software
- License: Proprietary
- Website: www.mindomo.com

Mindomo is a web-based freemium collaborative diagramming and outlining tool that allows users to develop ideas and interactively brainstorm, with features including sharing, collaboration, task management. It is produced by Expert Software Applications.

== History ==
- In 2006, development was begun at Expert Software Application for a mind mapping tool called Mindomo using Adobe Flex development kit which is based on Adobe Flash platform.
- In 2007, Mindomo web app was launched. The user interface used a ribbon consistent with office 2007.
- In 2008, Mindomo Desktop Version was Released that would requires installing Adobe AIR platform.
- In 2010, Real-Time collaboration was introduced.
- In 2011, Mindomo version 6.0 was released ditching the office like ribbon and introduced a minimalist interface with no compromise on functionality.
- In 2011, Mindomo Presenter was Released.
- In 2012, Mindomo apps for iPad and Android were released.
- In 2014, Mindomo web app made the shift from Flash to HTML5.
- In 2016, Mindomo Desktop 8.0 was released offer a consistent interface with the web version and no longer requiring Adobe Air.
- In 2018, Gantt chart was Introduced.
- In 2020, Mindomo Android app was redesigned from the ground up to support vertical screen with minimalist interface.
- In 2021, Mindomo web version received a major interface redesign along with releasing Mindomo desktop version 10.0 with minimalist and modern new graphical interface.
- In 2022 summary functionality was added.

== Features ==
Mindomo has modular nodes where users can insert videos, audio, images, notes, emoji, hyperlinks and attachments to any other node. Users can collaborate in real time and can choose to publish their work. Mindomo also features a presentation mode, allowing users to present creations using camera controlls.

Mindomo can be used from any standard web browser, or by installing the desktop, iPad and Android applications. As a freemium software, Mindomo offers its basic services for free, and charges for premium features, such as downloading in certain formats and uploading documents.

For the educational sector, Mindomo offers student assignments for teachers, integration with many learning-management systems, and allows students to include videos, images and external files to support their ideas.

Mindomo offers teachers with assignment tool that allow them to send an online request to their students inviting them to access incomplete mind map about a specific lesson. Student starts working in groups and begin exploring their broad topic questions and all their changes will be sent to their teacher as notifications in which he can provide feedback via Mindomo comment feature. In the end students encouraged to turn their mind map into a presentation using Mindomo presenter to explain their research process step by step. Mindomo also allows for printing mind map on paper, which can be annotated and also distributed to other students for peer review.

Mindomo's business features include task assignment for team members, commenting, and projects planning with Gantt chart views. Team members can share mind maps and make their own updates. Individuals can be assigned to each business function, and subtopics that need focus can be prioritized.

Michael Stratton, author of "The Effective Project Manager", used Mindomo for examples of using mind maps in project management.

== Reception ==
When Mindomo launched in 2007, Chuck Frey, author of "The Mind Mapping Software Blog" wrote, "Mindomo sets a new standard for web-based mind mapping tools with features that rivals many desktop mind maps. In 2014, Mindomo was available to all public schools in Ontario, Canada, as it was approved by the Ontario Software Acquisition Program Advisory Committee (OSAPAC), which advises the Canadian Ministry of Education on the acquisition of provincial licenses for publicly-funded schools in Ontario.

In 2019, Mindomo won PC Magazine's Editors' Choice award as "best mind mapping tool", citing how it coupled mind-mapping with the social aspects of knowledge management.
