= Creately =

Business diagram software

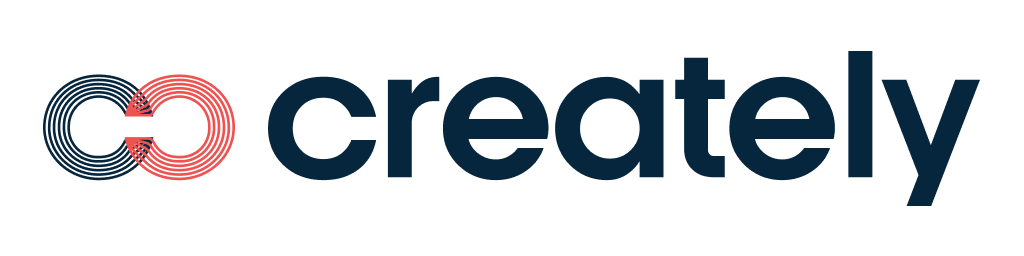
- Original author: Chandika Jayasundara
- Initial release: October 2008; 17 years ago
- Platform: Web-based
- Type: Diagramming software
- License: Free and paid subscription
- Website: Official website

Creately is a SaaS visual collaboration tool with diagramming and design capabilities designed by Cinergix. The application is mostly known for creating flowcharts, organization charts, project charts, UML diagrams, mind maps, and other business visuals.

== History ==
The initial beta version of Creately was released by Chandika Jayasundara. Hiraash Thawfeek, Nick Foster and Charanjit Singh joined the project in the same year. Chandika Jayasundara is CEO of Cinergix. The headquarters of the company is located at Mentone, Victoria, Australia.

== Features and reception ==
Creately provides predefined templates and diagram elements for incorporating in the projects. It provides drag and drop feature with which both predefined and custom made shapes can be included to build the desired diagram while the same workspace can be shared with multiple persons for collaboration.

Some experts have reviewed the application by commenting on its lacking in accessible integration options as its downside. The company claims Creately to have integration feature with Slack, Confluence while not having the integration with Zapier and OneDrive yet. It is compatible with Google Drive and Dropbox. The software is available as both freemium and paid option.

== See also ==
- Data and information visualization
- Data-flow diagram
- Mind map
- Technical drawing
- Infographic
