= MindMapper =

Mind mapping software

- Other names: ThinkWise
- Developer: SimTech Systems
- Stable release: 21 (Build 9203) / October 11, 2021
- Operating system: Microsoft Windows, iOS, Android
- Type: Mind mapping, Planner
- License: Commercial
- Website: www.mindmapper.com

MindMapper (also known as ThinkWise) is a mind mapping software and mental organization tool developed by SimTech Systems. It allows users to create a mind map from thoughts in the brain and convert it into software programs such as Word, PowerPoint, or Hangul Office. As of 2020, the software was used by more than 10,000 organizations and companies in 96 countries.

== History and overview ==
MindMapper was first developed as an in-house tool to help with industrial simulation projects for SimTech Systems in 1997. The tool combines the versatility of a mind mapping program with a reliable dashboard and a built-in planner. Some of its main features include knowledge management, brainstorming, creative thinking, visual thinking, clear communication, problem-solving, and project management.

== Usage ==
Mind Mapper is used by corporations, the Army, the Supreme Court, along with education institutes and universities. It can also be used for research review process and synthesis.

== Reviews ==
As per Predictive Analytics Today, the software can be used by students, professionals and artists for information visualizing, analyzing and implementing plans.
