= Study software =

Study software refers to computer programs designed to enhance the effectiveness of learning by improving the way students engage with, process, and retain information. It facilitates the application of efficient study techniques, optimizing the learning process within a given time frame.

Different academic subjects may require different study approaches. For instance, mathematics often relies on problem-solving techniques, whereas language learning emphasizes memorization and contextual understanding. Some study software serves as subject-specific learning tools, while others focus on general study methodologies.

Due to its diverse applications, study software encompasses a broad range of overlapping program types.

== Origins ==
Research has demonstrated that certain learning methods are more effective than others and that explicitly teaching study skills can benefit students. Study software addresses this by guiding learners toward effective study practices without requiring in-depth knowledge of cognitive science.

Historically, two of the most widely used types of study software are mind-mapping programs and flashcard applications. Mind-mapping software is particularly useful for organizing and structuring information but has limited utility once the material is well-structured. Flashcard software, on the other hand, is effective for memorization and recall, although it is sometimes criticized for encouraging rote learning.

Hybrid study tools combining elements of both approaches also exist, including programs that allow students to test their knowledge using their own notes.

== Benefits ==
Study software offers several advantages, including:

- A variety of information formats (images, sound, diagrams, etc.).
- Easy access to resources via databases.
- Optimized note-taking with features like Microsoft Ink and speech recognition.
- Memorization techniques using colors, images, and mind maps.
- The use of hypertext to link related information.
- Testing and revision tools based on the spacing effect.
- Personalized content adaptation according to the student's level and progress.

== Barriers ==
Barriers to the use of study software include:

- The need for appropriate hardware and access to digital content.
- The requirement to develop certain technical skills (e.g., typing, touchscreen navigation).
- The cost of software and equipment, which may be prohibitive for some institutions.
- Programs don't communicate together as they could (see Unix philosophy). Self-contained programs either don't offer enough features (e.g. calculation of the spacing effect to learn faster) or offer more than they should (Software bloat).
- Content might differ significantly in different countries.
- Overreliance on software, which may hinder the development of autonomy and critical thinking.

== See also ==
- Computer-assisted language learning
- Flashcard
- Forgetting curve
- Free recall
- List of concept- and mind-mapping software
- List of flashcard software
- Memory
- Mind map
- Notetaking
- Spaced repetition
- Spacing effect
