= FreeMind =

Free mind mapping application

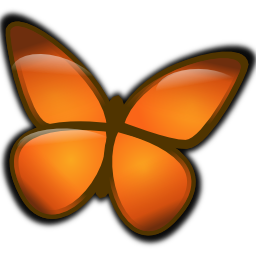

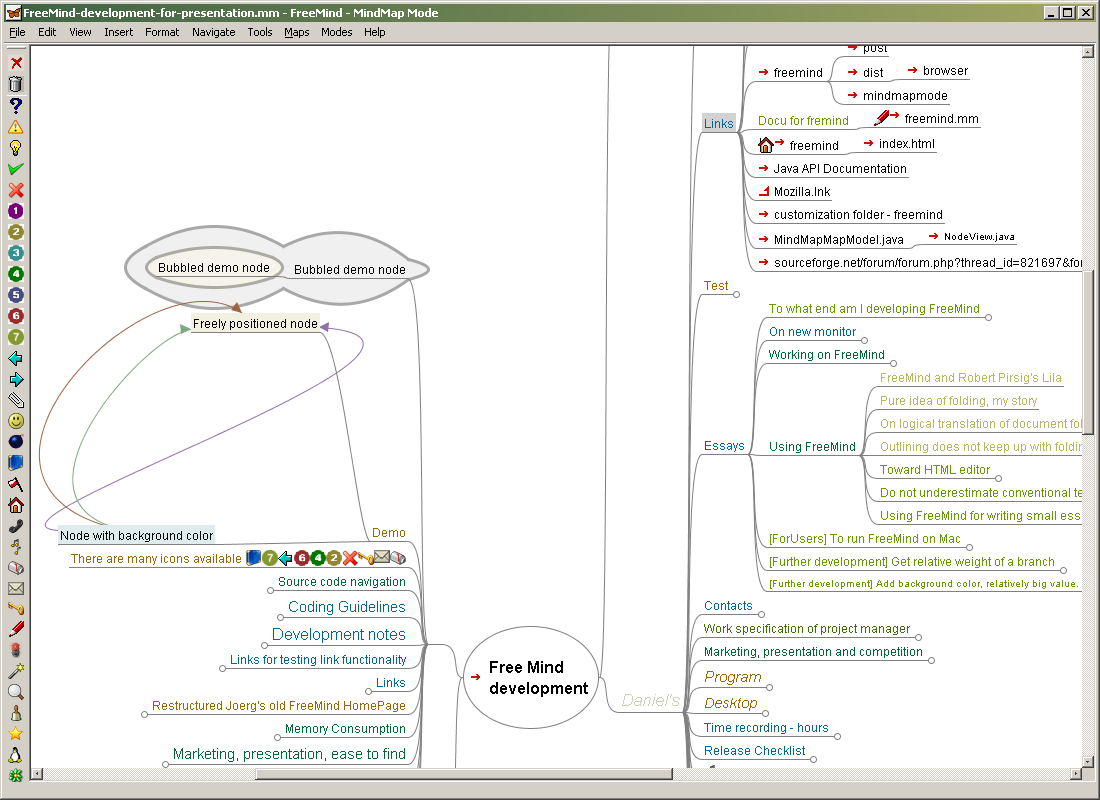
- Developers: Jörg Müller, Daniel Polansky, Petr Novak, Christian Foltin, Dimitri Polivaev, et al.
- Final release: FreeMind 1.0.1 / 12 April 2014; 11 years ago
- Preview release: 1.1.0 Beta2 / 7 February 2016; 9 years ago
- Repository: git.code.sf.net/p/freemind/code
- Operating system: Cross-platform
- Platform: Java
- Type: Project management
- License: GNU GPL
- Website: Freemind at sourceforge.net

FreeMind is a free mind mapping application written in Java, which is further developed by the fork Freeplane. FreeMind itself was last updated in 2014. FreeMind is licensed under the GNU General Public License Version 2. It provides extensive export capabilities. It runs on Microsoft Windows, Linux, and macOS via the Java Runtime Environment.

As with other mind mapping software packages, FreeMind allows the user to edit a hierarchical set of ideas around a central concept. The non-linear approach assists in brainstorming new outlines and projects as ideas are added around the mind map. As a Java application, FreeMind is portable across multiple platforms and retains the same user interface, causing some amount of variation from the common interface on each platform. Mac users may notice the most difference from their traditional user interface, but a MacWorld reviewer says the software's features should still appeal to the segment of users who accept function over form.

FreeMind was a finalist for Best Project in SourceForge.net's Community Choice Awards for 2008, which featured open-source software projects.

== Features ==
FreeMind's documentation is itself available as a FreeMind mindmap, demonstrating many of the features of the application. This is accessed from the application menu: Help > Documentation. A flash based export of this documentation is available online and can be viewed from flash-enabled web browsers. The link can be found in the external links section.

FreeMind's most significant features are as follows:

- Folding branches
- Save files as XML with an mm suffix
- Export hypertext to HTML and XHTML
- Export document to PDF and OpenDocument
- Exports image to PNG, JPEG and SVG
- Icons on nodes
- Clouds around branches
- Graphical links connecting nodes
- Search restricted to single branches
- Web and file hyperlinks from nodes
- FreeMind browser/player for web in Java or Flash
- Transform maps using XSLT

FreeMind uses the Swing GUI toolkit for Java.

FreeMind developers or developers of other projects have made plugins for various wiki and content management system software so that Freemind files can be viewed and in some cases created via the web interface.

== See also ==
- Freeplane, a FreeMind fork
- List of mind mapping software
- Mind map
