= Kuali =

Educational software services company

Kuali Inc.
- Company type: Private
- Industry: Software as a Service (SaaS)
- Predecessor: Kuali Foundation
- Founded: 2014
- Headquarters: United States
- Area served: Worldwide
- Products: Kuali Build; Kuali Research; Kuali Ready; Kuali Student; Kuali Financial System

Kuali Inc. is a Software as a Service (SaaS) company focused on creating software for higher education. Kuali's software includes no-code forms and workflow, curriculum management, research administration, financial management, and business continuity planning.

== History ==
In 2004 the Kuali Project was initiated by the University of Hawaii, Indiana University, rSmart, and The National Association of College and University of Business Officers (NACUBO). The project received its initial funding of $2.5 million from the Andrew W. Mellon Foundation.

In 2005, Kuali became a non-profit organization, officially known as the Kuali Foundation.

In August 2014 the Kuali Foundation announced the launch of its for-profit commercial entity. Kuali re-licensed and assumed responsibility for the development of the Kuali community software, moving it to the cloud. The Kuali foundation disbanded in 2023, noting the extensive adoption of Kuali software by educational institutions.
