= MindMup =

Mind mapping application in JavaScript

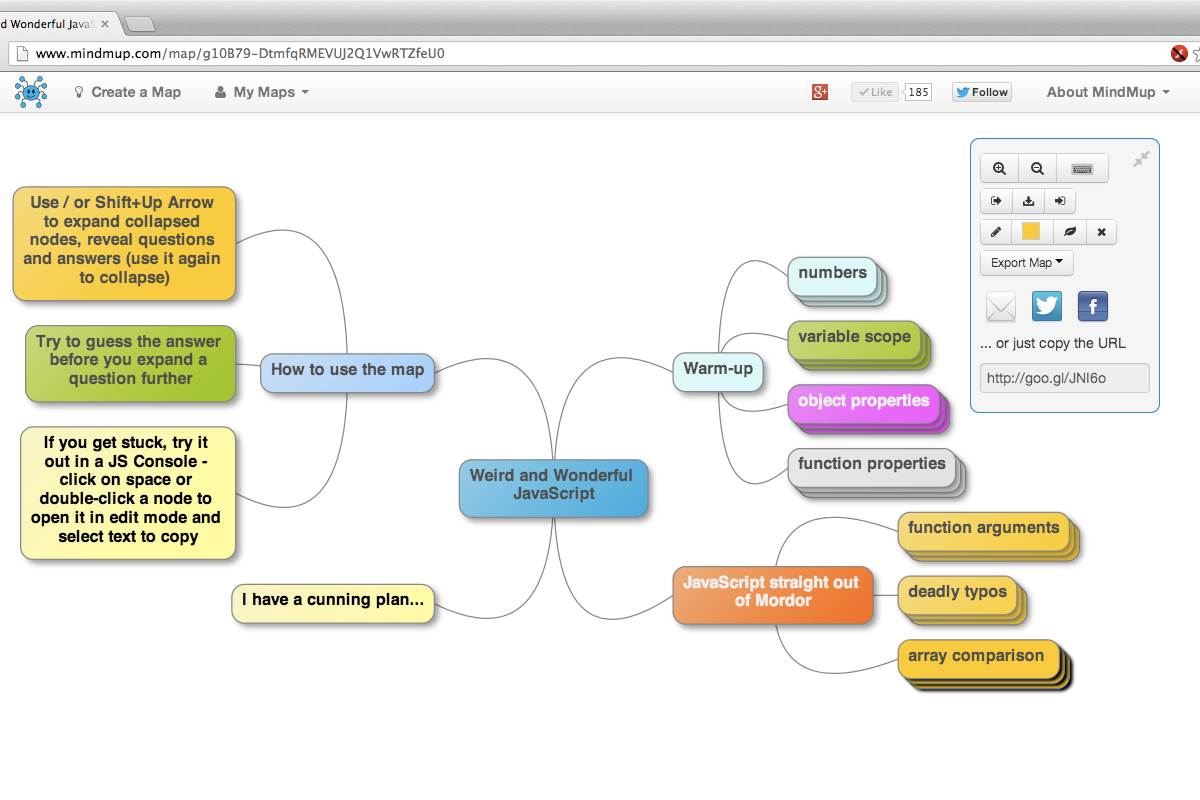
- Written in: JavaScript
- Operating system: Cross-platform
- Platform: HTML5 browser
- Type: Mind Mapping
- License: Non-free license with restriction on use.
- Website: www.mindmup.com
- Repository: github.com/mindmup/mindmup

MindMup is a mind mapping application written primarily in JavaScript and designed to run in HTML5 browsers. It can also be used to create argument maps and concept maps. MindMup v1 was released under an MIT-like license with a non-compete clause that restricts use, which makes it non-free software. The source code is available from GitHub. On 1 January 2017, the project was discontinued. Current version of the site software is not open source, and there are no plans to open source it.
