= View Your Mind =

Mind mapping software

View Your Mind (VYM)
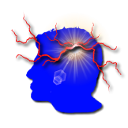

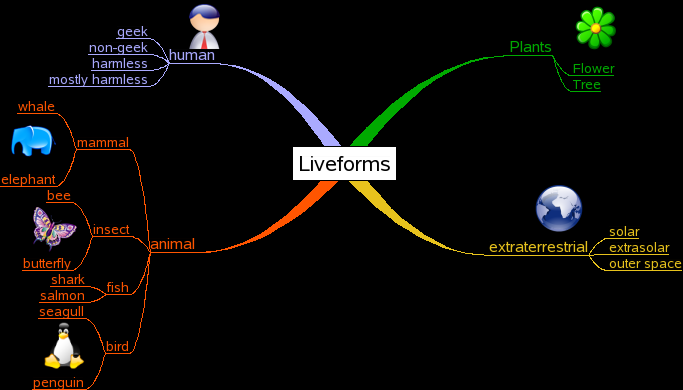
- Stable release: 3.0.0 / 7 July 2026; 4 months ago
- Operating system: Cross-platform but no recent functional version for Mac OS X
- Available in: 15 languages
- Type: Concept Mapping software
- License: GPL-2.0
- Website: sourceforge.net/projects/vym/
- Repository: github.com/insilmaril/vym

View Your Mind (VYM) is a cross-platform concept mapping software.

== Background and reception ==
In The Fun Is In the Journey, Eugene Vickery said he mostly works with VYM because it does not require Java. VYM was also described as a tool for "easy access to URLs, programs and folders. In SUSE Linux 10 Unleashed, Michael McCallister, highlighted similarities to Dia and the ability to attach documents to the map. Completing a Professional Practice Dissertation: A Guide for Doctoral Students and Faculty described the application as one of two free "brainstorming software" programs "that may help you create a graphic representation of your research plan."

In an article on installing and using VYM, technical writer Jack Wallen called VYM "one of the most user-friendly" of many mind mapping tools available. In a detailed article on VYM, Michal Černý, a university teacher of technology in education, concluded that compared with other open competitors, the maps appear better and there are more setup options than Freemind, but keyboard shortcuts are unusual, and the program can seem cumbersome or illogical. He was favorably impressed with notes and links, basic time management support, organic maps and presentation mode, and scripting support. In a brief article on VYM and its installation, it was called "useful in organizing thoughts and structuring works, whether academic or not," and was said to have "many productive shortcuts." In a list of 50 mental and conceptual map building tools, Monica Edwards Schachter said VYM had some problems, based on forums, but mentioned it had image search. In a 2006 comparative analysis of eight conceptual mapping programs, VYM was ranked 7th.

== See also ==
- List of concept- and mind-mapping software
