= Educational Community License =

- Latest version: 2.0
- Published: 2007
- SPDX identifier: ECL-1.0, ECL-2.0
- Debian FSG compatible: ?
- FSF approved: Yes
- OSI approved: Yes
- Copyleft: No
- Linking from code with a different license: Yes

The Educational Community License (ECL) is a free and open source license based on the Apache license (version 2.0) and created with the specific needs of the academic community in mind.

Version 2.0 of the ECL came out of the Licensing and Policy Summit held in October 2006 in Indianapolis, Indiana where members of the academic community came together to address the concerns of releasing software written at an academic institution under a free/open source license. Members of the summit included university attorneys, technology transfer officers, free/open source project leaders, and foundation representatives. In particular, representatives of the Sakai Project and Kuali Foundation were in attendance.

ECL version 2.0 was approved by the Open Source Initiative in the Summer of 2007, and the Free Software Foundation lists it as being a "GPL-Compatible Free Software License" that is compatible with version 3 of the GNU General Public License but not compatible with GPLv2. This means that a software developer can mix code from an ECLv2 licensed project and a GPLv3 licensed project but, due to license terms incompatibility, they are not allowed to mix code from an ECLv2 project and a GPLv2 project.

EDUCAUSE (Ref 2 below) says of the ECL, "It is essentially the Apache 2.0 license with a modification of the patent language to make it workable for many colleges and universities." The two patent clauses are reproduced below.

The Apache licence patent clause states:

"3. Grant of Patent License. Subject to the terms and conditions of this License, each Contributor hereby grants to You a perpetual, worldwide, non-exclusive, no-charge, royalty-free, irrevocable (except as stated in this section) patent license to make, have made, use, offer to sell, sell, import, and otherwise transfer the Work, where such license applies only to those patent claims licensable by such Contributor that are necessarily infringed by their Contribution(s) alone or by combination of their Contribution(s) with the Work to which such Contribution(s) was submitted. If You institute patent litigation against any entity (including a cross-claim or counterclaim in a lawsuit) alleging that the Work or a Contribution incorporated within the Work constitutes direct or contributory patent infringement, then any patent licenses granted to You under this License for that Work shall terminate as of the date such litigation is filed."

The ECL patent clause states (differences are underlined):

"3. Grant of Patent License. Subject to the terms and conditions of this License, each Contributor hereby grants to You a perpetual, worldwide, non-exclusive, no-charge, royalty-free, irrevocable (except as stated in this section) patent license to make, have made, use, offer to sell, sell, import, and otherwise transfer the Work, where such license applies only to those patent claims licensable by such Contributor that are necessarily infringed by their Contribution(s) alone or by combination of their Contribution(s) with the Work to which such Contribution(s) was submitted. If You institute patent litigation against any entity (including a cross-claim or counterclaim in a lawsuit) alleging that the Work or a Contribution incorporated within the Work constitutes direct or contributory patent infringement, then any patent licenses granted to You under this License for that Work shall terminate as of the date such litigation is filed. Any patent license granted hereby with respect to contributions by an individual employed by an institution or organization is limited to patent claims where the individual that is the author of the Work is also the inventor of the patent claims licensed, and where the organization or institution has the right to grant such license under applicable grant and research funding agreements. No other express or implied licenses are granted."
