= Spider diagram =

In mathematics, a unitary spider diagram adds existential points to an Euler or a Venn diagram. The points indicate the existence of an attribute described by the intersection of contours in the Euler diagram. These points may be joined forming a shape like a spider. Joined points represent an "or" condition, also known as a logical disjunction.

A spider diagram is a boolean expression involving unitary spider diagrams and the logical symbols $\land,\lor,\lnot$. For example, it may consist of the conjunction of two spider diagrams, the disjunction of two spider diagrams, or the negation of a spider diagram.

== Example ==
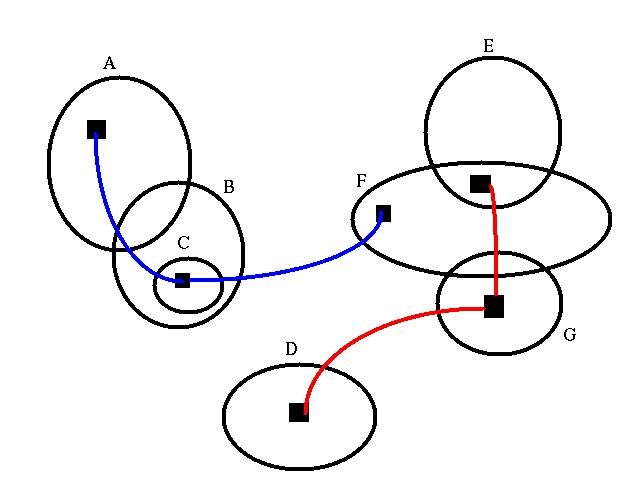
Logical disjunction superimposed on Euler diagram

In the image shown, the following conjunctions are apparent from the Euler diagram.

$$A \land B$$
$$B \land C$$
$$F \land E$$
$$G \land F$$

In the universe of discourse defined by this Euler diagram, in addition to the conjunctions specified above, all of the sets from A through G, except for C, are available separately. The set C is only available as a subset of B. Often, in complicated diagrams, singleton sets and/or conjunctions may be obscured by other set combinations.

The two spiders in the example correspond to the following logical expressions:

- Red spider: $(F \land E) \lor (G) \lor (D)$
- Blue spider: $(A) \lor (C \land B) \lor (F)$
