= Group concept mapping =

Method of organizing groups of related concepts

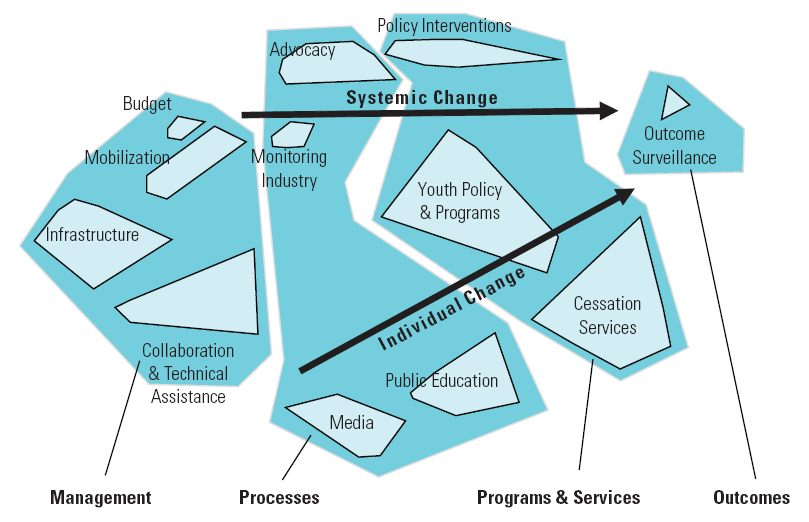
A group concept map showing clusters

Group concept mapping is a structured methodology for organizing the ideas of a group on any topic of interest and representing those ideas visually in a series of interrelated maps. It is a type of integrative mixed method, combining qualitative and quantitative approaches to data collection and analysis. Group concept mapping allows for a collaborative group process with groups of any size, including a broad and diverse array of participants. Since its development in the late 1980s by William M.K. Trochim at Cornell University, it has been applied to various fields and contexts, including community and public health, social work, health care, human services,, instructional interventions, and biomedical research and evaluation.

== Overview ==
Group concept mapping integrates qualitative group processes with multivariate analysis to help a group organize and visually represent its ideas on any topic of interest through a series of related maps. It combines the ideas of diverse participants to show what the group thinks and values in relation to the specific topic of interest. It is a type of structured conceptualization used by groups to develop a conceptual framework, often to help guide evaluation and planning efforts. Group concept mapping is participatory in nature, allowing participants to have an equal voice and to contribute through various methods. A group concept map visually represents all the ideas of a group and how they relate to each other, and depending on the scale, which ideas are more relevant, important, or feasible.

== Process ==
Group concept mapping involves a structured multi-step process, including brainstorming, sorting and rating, multidimensional scaling and cluster analysis, and the generation and interpretation of multiple maps. The first step requires participants to brainstorm a large set of statements relevant to the topic of interest, usually in response to a focus prompt. Participants are then asked to individually sort those statements into categories based on their perceived similarity and rate each statement on one or more scales, such as importance or feasibility.

The data is then analyzed using The Concept System software, which creates a series of interrelated maps using multidimensional scaling (MDS) of the sort data, hierarchical clustering of the MDS coordinates applying Ward's method, and the computation of average ratings for each statement and cluster of statements. The resulting maps display the individual statements in two-dimensional space with more similar statements located closer to each other, and grouped into clusters that partition the space on the map. The Concept System software also creates other maps that show the statements in each cluster rated on one or more scales, and absolute or relative cluster ratings between two cluster sets. As a last step in the process, participants are led through a structured interpretation session to better understand and label all the maps.

== History ==
Group concept mapping was developed as a methodology in the late 1980s by William M.K. Trochim at Cornell University. Trochim is considered to be a leading evaluation expert, and he has taught evaluation and research methods at Cornell since 1980. Originally called "concept mapping", the methodology has evolved since its inception with the maturation of the field and the continued advancement of the software, which is now a Web application.

== Uses ==
Group concept mapping can be used with any group for any topic of interest. It is often used by government agencies, academic institutions, national associations, not-for-profit and community-based organizations, and private businesses to help turn the ideas of the group into measurable actions. This includes in the areas of organizational development, strategic planning, needs assessment, curriculum development, research, and evaluation. Group concept mapping is well-documented, well-established methodology, and it has been used in hundreds of published papers.

== Versus concept mapping and mind mapping ==
More generally, concept mapping is any process used for visually representing relationships between ideas in pictures or diagrams. A concept map is typically a diagram of multiple ideas, often represented as boxes or circles, linked in a graph (network) structure through arrows and words where each idea is connected to another. The technique was originally developed in the 1970s by Joseph D. Novak at Cornell University. Concept mapping may be done by an individual or a group.

A mind map is a diagram used to visually represent information, centering on one word or idea with categories and sub-categories radiating off of it in a tree structure. Popularized by Tony Buzan in the 1970s, mind mapping is often a spontaneous exercise done by an individual or group to gather information about what they think around a single topic.

Unlike Novak's concept maps and Buzan's mind maps, group concept mapping has a structured mathematical process (card sorting and rating, multidimensional scaling and cluster analysis) for organizing and visually representing multiple ideas of a group through a series of specific steps. In other words, in group concept mapping, the resulting visual representations are mathematically generated from mixed (qualitative and quantitative) data collected from a group of research subjects, whereas in Novak's concept maps and Buzan's mind maps the visual representations are drawn directly by the subjects resulting in diagrams that are qualitative data and final product at the same time.

== See also ==
- Card sorting
- Computer-assisted qualitative data analysis software
- Knowledge representation and reasoning
- List of concept- and mind-mapping software
- Problem structuring methods
- Q methodology
