= Institute for Dynamic Educational Advancement =

American non-profit organization

- Founded: 1998
- Founder: Michael Douma
- Type: Non-Profit Organization
- Purpose: mobile apps, education
- Origins: Rockville, MD
- Website: http://www.idea.org/

The Institute for Dynamic Educational Advancement (IDEA.org) is a U.S.-based nonprofit organization working in the area of scientific and cultural literacy. The organization was established in 1998 and incorporated in 2002, and has collaborated with museums, schools, nonprofit organizations, and public service projects.

== Activities ==
- WebExhibits "virtual museum" – in 1999, IDEA founded the WebExhibits virtual museum, an interactive, virtual museum of science, humanities, and culture that uses information, virtual experiments, and hands-on activities that prompt visitors to think, to formulate questions, and to explore topics from a variety of angles. IDEA published research on exhibit design and usability, and advocated for the format as an effective approach to draw in visitors to complex, multidisciplinary topics.
- SpicyNodes - is a presentation method for visually browsing hierarchical information, similar to concept mapping. Several implementations of SpicyNodes have been developed by IDEA, including a web-based version built on Adobe Flash which is available as a Software as a service web site with both free and paid versions; and as multitouch version for the iPad released in Spring 2011 as part of the "WikiNodes" app. The web-based implementation received a "Best Website for Teaching and Learning" award in 2011 from American Association of School Librarians (AASL), and was voted #edchat's 35 Best Web 2.0 Classroom Tools in 2010. It has been a subject of instruction in several schools.

The product is used in a broad number of disciplines, and has an open API, allowing developers to use it for visualization tasks as well as to create mashups.

- WikiNodes - is an app for the Apple iPad which uses the SpicyNodes visualization method. It is the first tablet app for browsing Wikipedia using a radial tree approach to visualize how articles and subsections of articles are interrelated. (Wikipedia's 'The Signpost', 13 June 2011)
- ColoRotate - is a project started in January 2006 to explain to the public, students, and graphic professionals the three-dimensional nature of color vision in the eye and mind. It is related to the color-related exhibits in the WebExhibit museum. It consists of a 3D color space within which users can see color points, and manipulate them. There are several implementations of the ColoRotate approach, including a free web site, a Photoshop plugin, a web widget, and an iPad app.
- Research - via its SpicyNodes project, IDEA researched ways for the public to author and use radial maps to display hierarchical information. IDEA sponsored a 2008 study on how people find information, which was widely cited in the blogosphere. The key finding was the designers and communication directors overestimate the ease with which users can find information online, and they tend to underestimate the value of basic qualities like current information and engaging writing. Additionally, IDEA researched culturally appropriate ways to collect information from diverse populations. IDEA has collaborated with cancer researchers to make prostate cancer prognosis tools available to the general public, and to bridge the gap of underserved, Native American communities dealing with cancer.

== See also ==
- Virtual museum
