= List of Wikipedia mobile apps =

Wikipedia
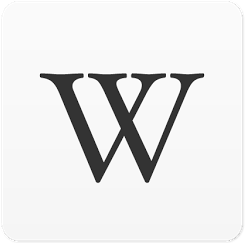

- Screenshot Official Wikipedia app for iOS
- Developer: Wikimedia Foundation
- Written in: Kotlin
- Website: doc.wikimedia.org
- Repository: Android; iOS

A number of organizations within the Wikimedia movement including the Wikimedia Foundation publish official mobile apps for mobile access to Wikipedia. All are available via the appropriate app store (e.g. Google Play, App Store, Microsoft Store, F-Droid). They can also be downloaded independently of any third-party store from the Wikimedia Foundation's releases website, which also keeps old and beta versions.

== Official apps ==
=== Wikimedia Foundation ===
Wikipedia apps from the Wikimedia Foundation are called "Wikipedia".

==== Android ====
The Android app allows users to read and edit articles directly from the app. It is available on Play Store, Galaxy Store, Aptoide, Cafe Bazaar, F-Droid, and GetJar. A separate app on the Play Store provides access to beta features that may not be available in the standard Wikipedia app.

In June 2025, a quiz game called Which Came First? was introduced to the app, which allows users to answer five questions regarding which historical event of two given events occurred first. A feature called Year in Review that allows users to see the time and topics they spent reading for a given year was also introduced that year.

==== iOS ====
The iOS app also allows users to read and edit articles directly from the app, similar to the Android app and mobile web version. It allows users to share an article via Facebook and other social websites, and to find geotagged articles near their current location. It does not allow users to see categories or see the normal desktop version.

It also supports to continue an article between devices using Apple Handoff.

==== Windows ====
The Metro-style app provides a read-only version of Wikipedia, similar to the mobile web version. The app when used in Windows RT is incapable of showing moving pictures.

==== KaiOS ====
The KaiOS app was released in April 2024.

=== Kiwix ===
Kiwix has developed a number of offline apps based on Wikipedia content.

Title	Description	Android	iOS	Windows	Linux	Other OS	Open source
Kiwix	Free program to download a whole Wikimedia project and read offline.	Yes	Yes	Windows 10 UWP; Older Windows (x86)	Linux, F-Droid; Firefox Add-on, Chrome Extension, S60 3rd edition, feature pack 1 or later can show ZIM files via WikiOnBoard	Yes	Yes
Medical Wikipedia (Offline)	Wikipedia's Offline Medical Encyclopedia. Based on Kiwix and developed in collaboration with Wiki Project Med Foundation.	AR, DE, EN, ES, FA, FR, JA, OR, PT, ZH	EN	WikiMed UWP EN; Kiwix JS + in-app download of any WikiMed language	only as content file (ZIM) in Kiwix or WikiOnBoard	Yes	Yes

== Unassociated apps ==
These apps were mainly developed to display articles and are often used on platforms for which an official Wikipedia app was not formerly available, such as Windows Phone. Typical features include searching for articles, bookmarks, sharing, or enlarging images.

Title	Description	Available	Android	iOS	Open source
WikiNodes	By Institute for Dynamic Educational Advancement (IDEA)	No	No	yes	No
Wikiwand	Made to allow easier navigation and search than the website or the site's own app	Yes	Currently invitation only	yes	No
Wikiweb	Wikiweb is a Wikipedia reader for iPhone and iPad that visualizes the connections between articles.	No	No	yes	No
TripEnhancer	TripEnhancer is a Wikipedia reader for Android that reads aloud articles in the surroundings of the user.	Yes	yes	No	No

== Related apps ==
There is an Android app for Wikimedia Commons, which is community maintained and described on the Commons mobile app page. There was also an Android app for Wiktionary, which is no longer available.

== See also ==
- Help:Mobile access
