= WikiNodes =

iPad app for browsing Wikipedia

WikiNodes was an app for the Apple iPad built by IDEA.org. WikiNodes was the first tablet app for browsing Wikipedia using a radial tree approach to visualize how articles and subsections of articles are interrelated. The app displayed related items (articles or sections of an article), which spread on the screen, as a spiderweb of icons.

== Operation ==
The app used the SpicyNodes visualization technique which was awarded a "best for teaching and learning" award in 2011 from American Association of School Librarians (AASL), and voted #edchat's 35 Best Web 2.0 Classroom Tools in 2010.

The user interface was based on two display modes:

- Page view – displays Wikipedia articles in long form, similar to how they appear on the main Wikipedia web site.
- Node view – divides Wikipedia articles into sections, and links articles to related articles, similar to mind mapping. The user can drag nodes, taps any node to display it in detail, with a panel to scroll to read the contents of the section. This provides a visual way to see the relationships between articles.

In June 2011, the app supported the 36 top Wikipedia languages (by number of articles).

== Reception ==
The app was highlighted as a "Staff pick" by Apple's U.S. App Store, Week of May 28, 2011; as "New and Noteworthy" by Apple's U.S. App Store, Week of May 5, 2011; and at other times by Apple's app stores for non-US countries. It has been favorably covered by several bloggers, including those in the references below.

== See also ==
- List of Wikipedia mobile applications – Other iOS mobile apps providing access to Wikipedia
- Radial tree – the general type of layout algorithm
- SpicyNodes – Information visualization technique
