= MultiNet =

Multilayered extended semantic networks (MultiNets) are both a knowledge representation paradigm and a language for meaning representation of natural language expressions that has been developed by Prof. Dr. Hermann Helbig on the basis of earlier Semantic Networks. It is used in a question-answering application for German called InSicht. It is also used to create a tutoring application developed by the university of University of Hagen to teach MultiNet to knowledge engineers.

MultiNet is claimed to be one of the most comprehensive and thoroughly described knowledge representation systems. It specifies conceptual structures by means of about 140 predefined relations and functions, which are systematically characterized and underpinned by a formal axiomatic apparatus. Apart from their relational connections, the concepts are embedded in a multidimensional space of layered attributes and their values. Another characteristic of MultiNet distinguishing it from simple semantic networks is the possibility to encapsulate whole partial networks and represent the resulting conceptual capsule as a node of higher order, which itself can be an argument of relations and functions. MultiNet has been used in practical NLP applications such as natural language interfaces to the Internet or question answering systems over large semantically annotated corpora with millions of sentences. MultiNet is also a cornerstone of the commercially available search engine SEMPRIA-Search, where it is used for the description of the computational lexicon and the background knowledge, for the syntactic-semantic analysis, for logical answer finding, as well as for the generation of natural language answers.

MultiNet is supported by a set of software tools and has been used to build large semantically based computational lexicons. The tools include a semantic interpreter WOCADI, which translates natural language expressions (phrases, sentences, texts) into formal MultiNet expressions, a workbench MWR+ for the knowledge engineer (comprising modules for automatic knowledge acquisition and reasoning), and a workbench LIA+ for the computer lexicographer supporting the creation of large semantically based computational lexica.
