= CmapTools =

Software for concept mapping

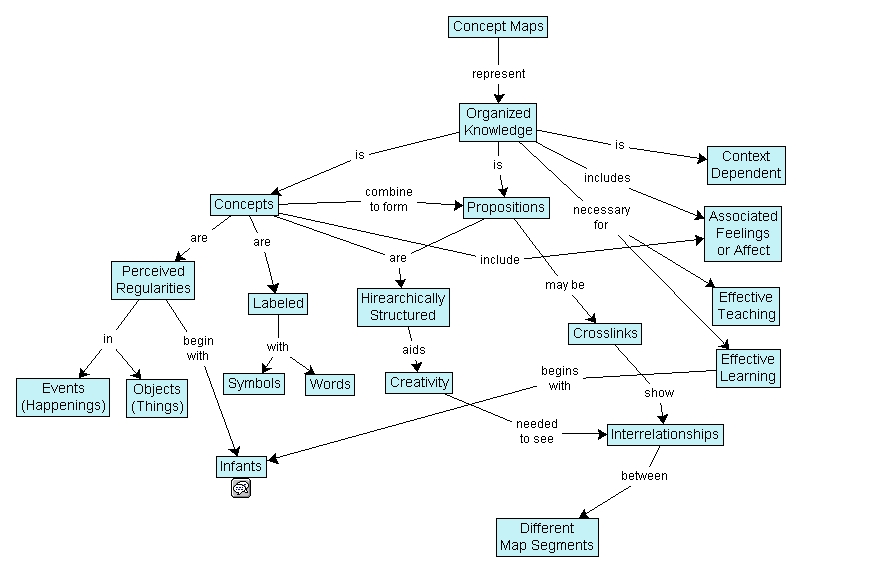
Example concept map created using the IHMC CmapTools computer program

CmapTools is concept mapping software developed by the Florida Institute for Human and Machine Cognition (IHMC). It allows users to easily create graphical nodes representing concepts, and to connect nodes using lines and linking words to form a network of interrelated propositions that represent knowledge of a topic. The software has been used in classrooms and research labs, and in corporate training.

== Use ==
The various uses of concept maps are supported by CmapTools.

Multiple links can be added to each concept to form a dynamic map that opens web pages or local documents; The links added receive a category chosen by the user on the provided list of types, to help with organization, some categories are: URLs; Documents; Images; and so on. Each link will be disposed accordingly with the category set by the user. The links are stacked by each category type under the chosen concept form (like show on the image sideway).

Even other concept maps can be linked to concepts letting the user construct a strong navigation tool.

Multiple maps connected can form a knowledge base, for example of a company structure, repository of standards, personal contacts and other important general information.
