= Spider mapping =

Diagram to visually organize information and show relationships between ideas

Spider mapping, sometimes called a semantic map, is a graphic organizer or concept map that can be used for brainstorming ideas, aspects, and thoughts typically on a single theme or topic. It is used to sort and evaluate multiple ideas and to show relationships between ideas. It gets its name because the central concept with ideas branching out appears similar to a spider or spiderweb. It is typically used when planning to write stories or papers, and in research brainstorming.

== Parts ==
The main idea starts in the center; concepts such as sub-ideas, views, support for or against, or major conflicts stem off of it. Other concepts may branch off of these throughout the process of mapping out ideas. There are many types of charts one can use; spider mapping is common and simple to use, with little planning required.

Aside from the main point, the sub-stems hold the important ideas, people, and views, conflicts to the main character or idea. They may include many sub-characters, minor characters, play comic relief, supporting roles, weaker conflict, or thought-provoking roles.

== Planning ==
A spider map is a planning tool; however, additional planning is needed before and after as not every idea can be turned into a story. There can many steps to take before or after creating a spider map; one is outlining.

== Benefits ==
Normally, one draws the chart out. Getting ideas on paper is the starting point; when the ideas are put down on paper, they are out of the writer's head, giving one the opportunity to think of how characters or ideas link together, what the conflict is, or what plot twists could make the story or idea more successful.

== See also ==
- Mind map – Diagram to visually organize information
