= Wikimedia Commons =

Online repository of media usable for any purpose

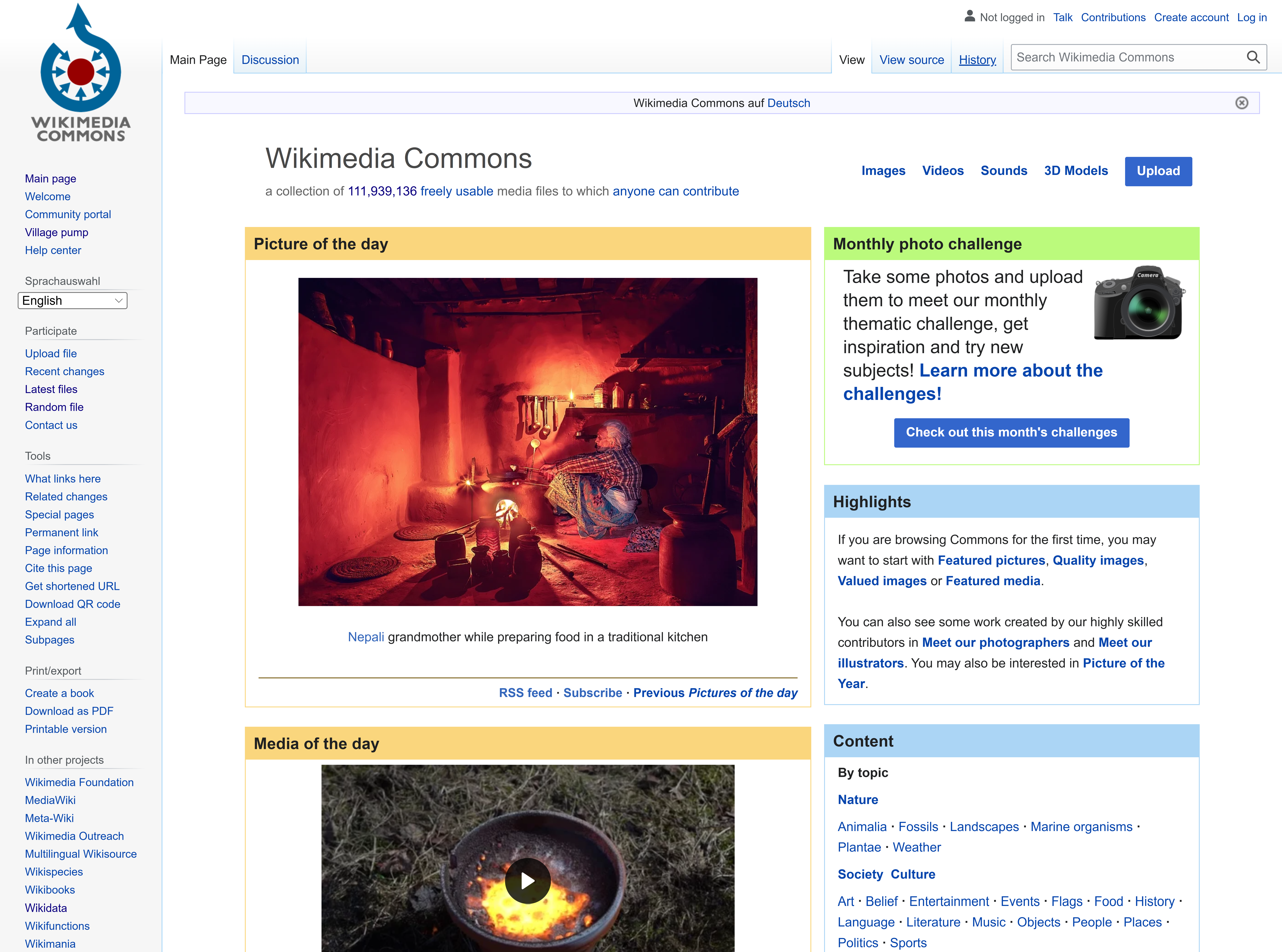
- The Wikimedia Commons main page in 2024
- Website type: Media repository
- Founded: September 7, 2004; 22 years ago
- Owner: Wikimedia Foundation
- Creator: Wikimedia movement
- Website: commons.wikimedia.org
- Commercial: No
- Registration: Optional (required to upload files)
- Current status: Active
- Content license: Public domain; various free content licenses

Wikimedia Commons, also known as Wikicommons, or simply Commons, is a wiki-based media repository of free-to-use (usable for any purpose) images, sounds, videos and other media. It is a project of the Wikimedia Foundation.

Files from Wikimedia Commons can be used across all of the Wikimedia projects in all languages, including Wikipedia, Wikivoyage, Wikisource, Wikiquote, Wiktionary, Wikinews, Wikibooks and Wikispecies, and can also be downloaded for offsite use. As of November 2026, the repository contains over 150 million free-to-use media files, managed and editable by registered volunteers.

== History ==
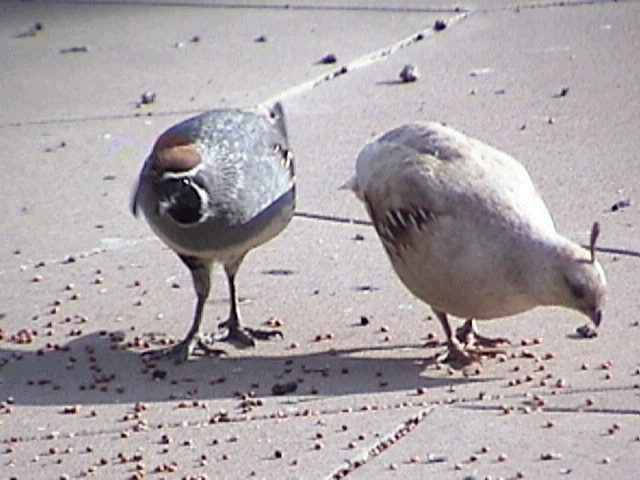
The first ever image uploaded to Wikimedia Commons

The concept for the project came from Erik Möller in March 2004 and Wikimedia Commons was started on September 7, 2004. In July 2013, the number of edits on Commons reached 100,000,000. In 2018, it became possible to upload 3D models to the site in STL format. One of the first models uploaded to Commons was a reconstruction of the Lion of Al-lāt statue in Palmyra, Syria, which was heavily damaged by ISIS militants in 2015.

Various notable organizations have uploaded files to Commons. In 2012, the National Archives and Records Administration uploaded 100,000 digitised images from its collection. In 2020, the Digital Public Library of America (DPLA) started uploading its collections to Commons. In 2022, DPLA uploaded more than two million files. Similarly Europeana, the website aggregating European cultural heritage, shares its digitised images through Commons. During the COVID-19 pandemic, as part of a collaboration with Wikimedia, the World Health Organization (WHO) uploaded its "Mythbusters" infographics to Commons.

== Policies and guidelines ==
As a repository for free-to-use media, Wikimedia Commons only allows content that is either published under a free license (such as certain Creative Commons licenses) or is out of copyright. Unlike files locally uploaded to Wikipedia or other Wikimedia projects, uploading media under fair use is not allowed, as the legal doctrine restricts the usage of the files, which does not meet the free content criteria. Additionally, files that are not determined to have an educational purpose are considered out of project scope and may be deleted.

Example of a file deletion request, with participating users citing copyright and project scope guidelines

Files that appear to violate the rules may be nominated for deletion, which prompts a discussion that users may participate in and give their opinion on the file's merits. After enough comments, an administrator will close the discussion and will either keep or delete the file, with the outcome mainly determined by consensus. Additionally, files that are a blatant violation of policies and guidelines may be tagged for speedy deletion.

== Use ==
Due to policies that only allow images and media that are either freely-licensed or out of copyright, content on Wikimedia Commons is frequently reused across various websites. According to research conducted in September 2019, over 50% of reused images contained people, 15% portrayed historical events and 10% depicted buildings. Commons media has also been used as training data for artificial intelligence text-to-image models, which caused a 50% increase in bandwidth consumption since January 2024.

== Relation to sister projects ==
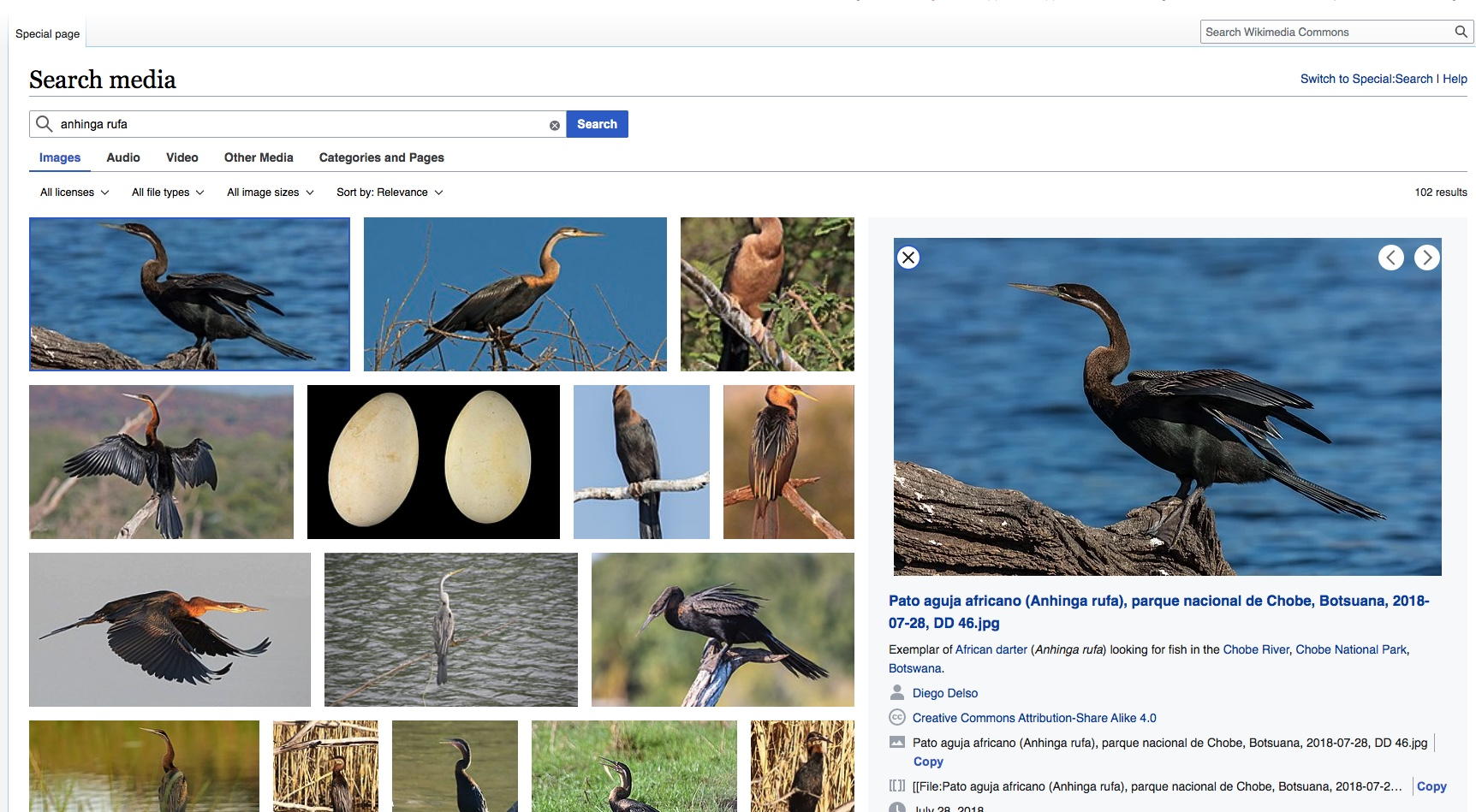
A page of Commons search results

The stated aim of Wikimedia Commons is to provide a media file repository "that makes available public domain and freely-licensed educational media content to all, and that acts as a common repository for the various projects of the Wikimedia Foundation."

Most Wikimedia projects still allow local uploads that are not visible to other projects or languages, but this option is meant to be used primarily for material (e.g., fair use content) that local project policies allow, but that would not be permitted according to the Commons' copyright policy. For this reason, Wikimedia Commons deletes copyright violations and aims to host only freely licensed media, e.g., media licensed with the Creative Commons Attribution and Attribution-ShareAlike licenses, other free content and free software licenses, and public domain media.

== Controversial content ==
The site has been criticized for hosting large amounts of amateur pornography, often uploaded by exhibitionists who exploit the site for personal gratification, and who are enabled by sympathetic administrators. In 2012, BuzzFeed described Wikimedia Commons as "littered with dicks."

In 2010, Wikipedia co-founder Larry Sanger reported Wikimedia Commons to the FBI for hosting sexualized images of children known as "lolicon." After this was reported in the media, Jimmy Wales, founder of the Wikimedia Foundation, which hosts Commons, used his administrator status to delete several images without discussion from the Commons community. Wales later voluntarily relinquished some site privileges, including the ability to delete files.

== Utilities ==
Over time, additional functionality has been developed to interface Wikimedia Commons with the other Wikimedia projects. For instance, a community-maintained Commons mobile app allows uploading of photos that document the world, especially notable objects findable in the map in the Nearby List in the app (displaying Wikidata items with coordinates). The app launched in 2012 as an official Wikimedia app and since May 2016, it uses the official Wikimedia Commons name and logo.

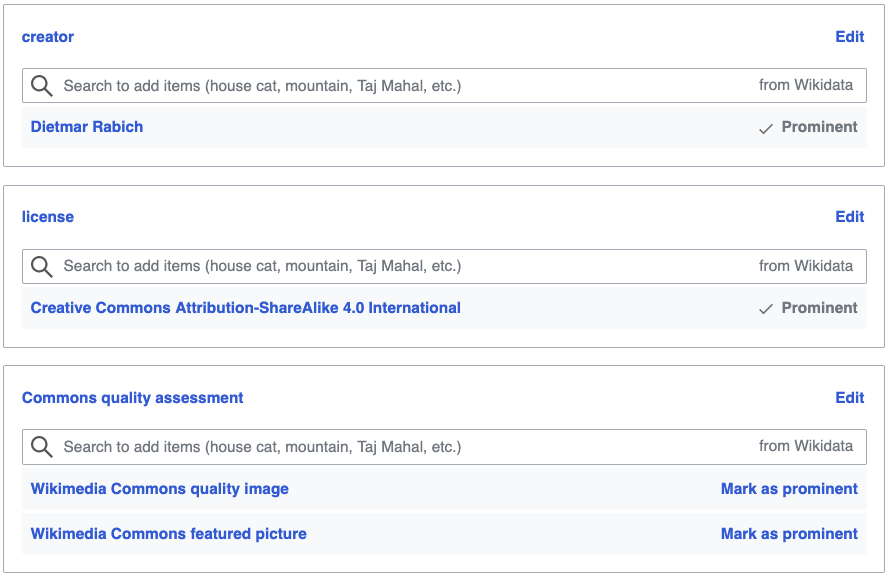
Structured data statements for a picture of some sugar cubes

Structured Data on Commons (SDC) is a three-year software development project funded by the Sloan Foundation to provide the infrastructure for Wikimedia Commons volunteers to organize data about media files in a consistent manner. This data is structured more and is made machine-readable.

== Quality ==
Successful featured picture nominations per month (2004–2019)

There are three mechanisms on the site for recognizing high-quality works. One is known as "Featured pictures", where works are nominated and other community members vote to accept or reject the nomination. This process began in November 2004. Another process known as "Quality images" began in June 2006, and has a simpler nomination process comparable to "Featured pictures". "Quality images" only accepts works created by Wikimedia users, whereas "Featured pictures" additionally accepts nominations of works by third parties such as NASA. A third image assessment project, known as "Valued images", began on June 1, 2008, with the purpose of recognizing "the most valued illustration of its kind", in contrast to the other two processes which assess images mainly on technical quality.

=== Wikimedia Commons Pictures of the Year ===
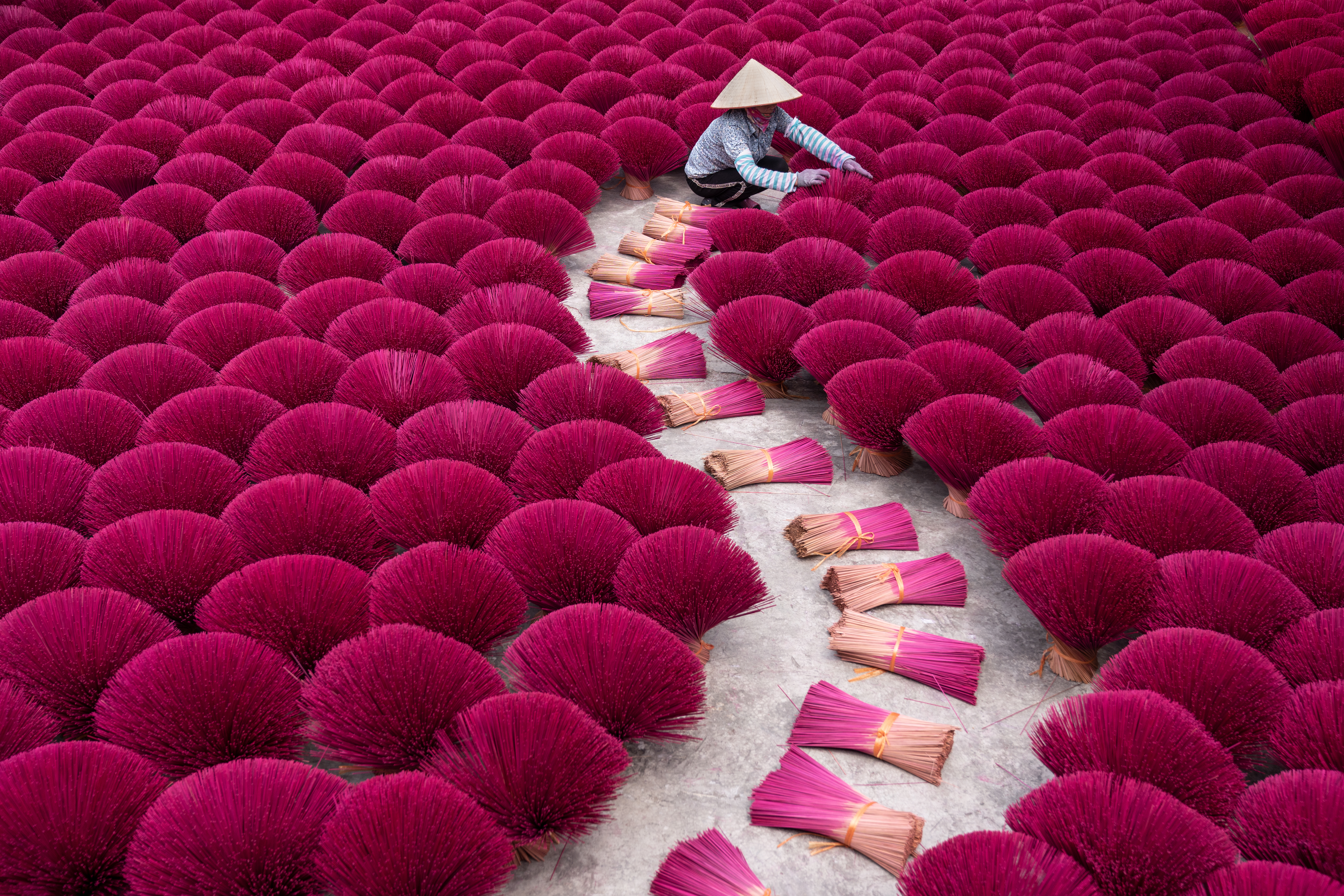
Picture winning the POTY competition in 2023. A farmer packs incense sticks in Quảng Phú Cầu, Vietnam.

The Commons Picture of the Year (POTY) is a competition that runs every year since 2006. It aims to identify the best freely licensed images from Commons submissions, including those that during the year have been awarded Featured picture status.

== Gallery ==
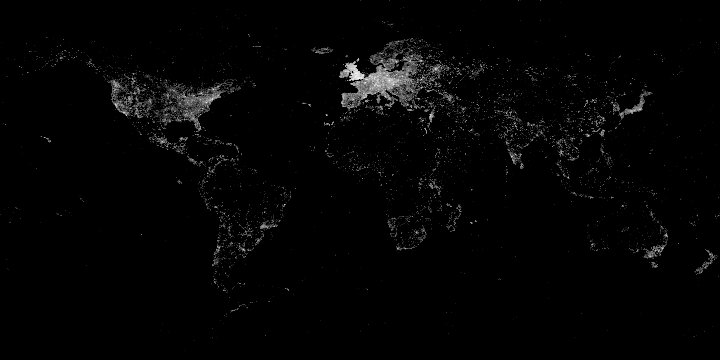
As of January 2015, there are about 5.2M geolocated images in Wikimedia Commons.

A chart showing the growth of Wikimedia Commons by number of files between 2004 and 2025

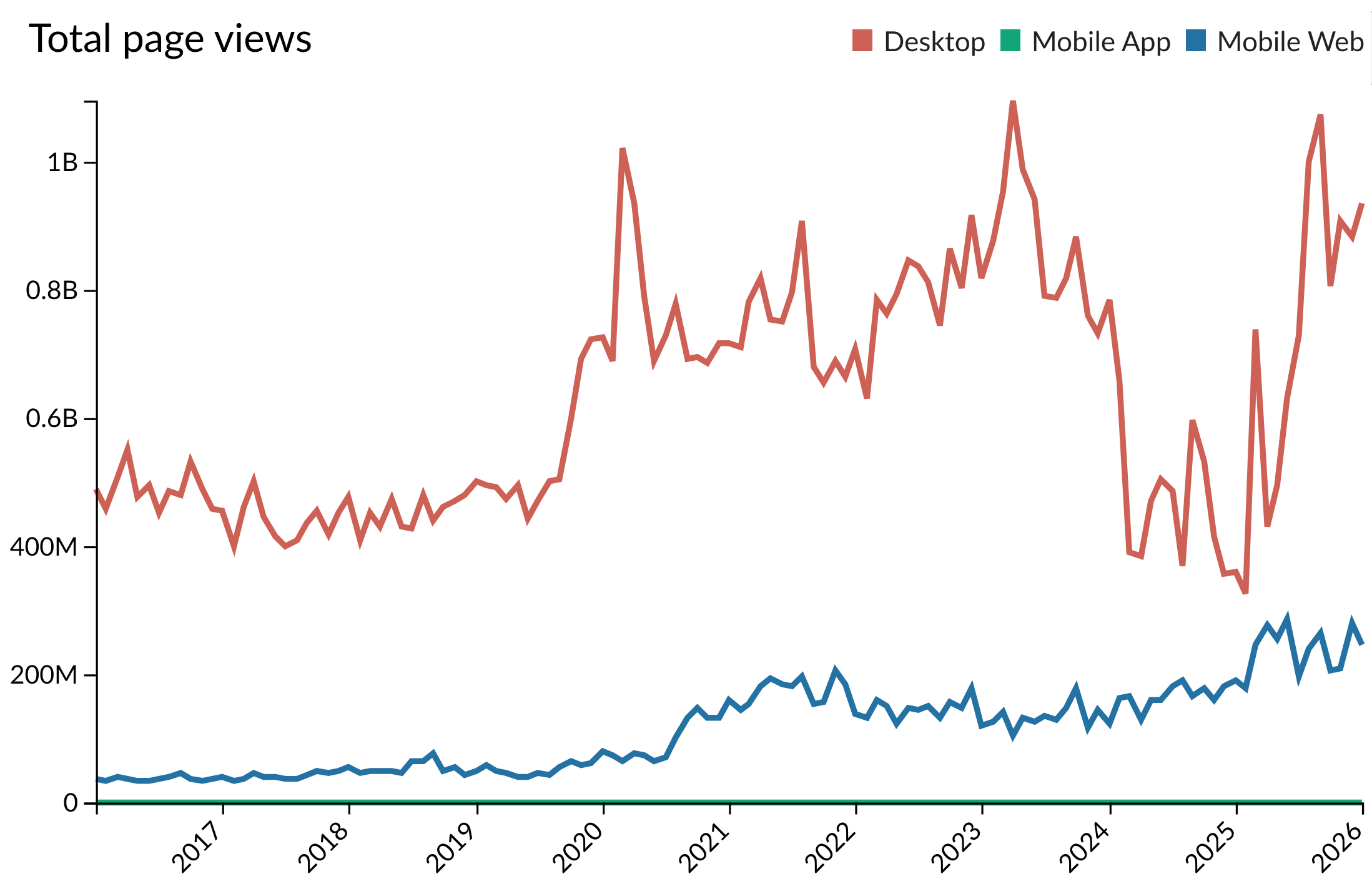
Total page views of Wikimedia Commons (split by desktop, mobile app, mobile web)

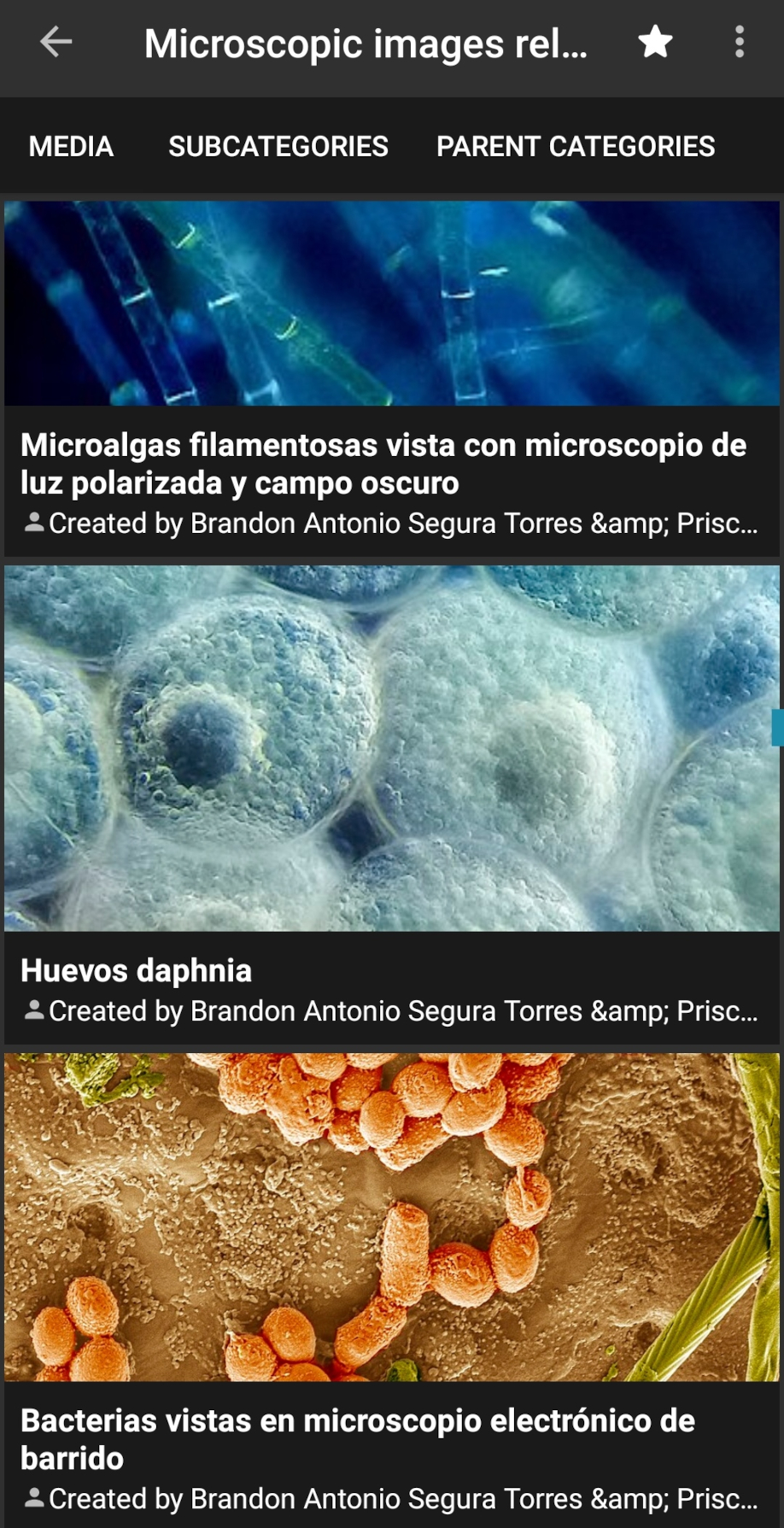
A category page in the Commons mobile app

== See also ==
- Creative Commons – an organization providing a set of content licenses and a directory of works using them
- Internet Archive – an online collection of videos, documents and webpages
- Project Gutenberg – the largest freely accessible collection of documents (including books and sheet music)
- Reporting of child pornography images on Wikimedia Commons
- The vanished bells project
