= Semantic similarity network =

Form of semantic network

A semantic similarity network (SSN) is a special form of semantic network. designed to represent concepts and their semantic similarity. Its main contribution is reducing the complexity of calculating semantic distances. Bendeck (2004, 2008) introduced the concept of semantic similarity networks (SSN) as the specialization of a semantic network to measure semantic similarity from ontological representations. Implementations include genetic information handling.

The concept is formally defined (Bendeck 2008) as a directed graph, with concepts represented as nodes and semantic similarity relations as edges. The relationships are grouped into relation types. The concepts and relations contain attribute values to evaluate the semantic similarity between concepts. The semantic similarity relationships of the SSN represent several of the general relationship types of the standard Semantic network, reducing the complexity of the (normally, very large) network for calculations of semantics. SSNs define relation types as templates (and taxonomy of relations) for semantic similarity attributes that are common to relations of the same type. SSN representation allows propagation algorithms to faster calculate semantic similarities, including stop conditions within a specified threshold. This reduces the computation time and power required for calculation.

A more recent publications on Semantic Matching and Semantic Similarity Networks could be found in (Bendeck 2019).

Specific Semantic Similarity Network application on healthcare was presented at the Healthcare information exchange Format (FHIR European Conference) 2019.
