= Semantic network =

Knowledge base that represents semantic relations between concepts in a network

Example of a semantic network

A semantic network, or frame network is a knowledge base that represents semantic relations between concepts in a network. This is often used as a form of knowledge representation. It is a directed or undirected graph consisting of vertices, which represent concepts, and edges, which represent semantic relations between concepts, mapping or connecting semantic fields. A semantic network may be instantiated as, for example, a graph database or a concept map. Typical standardized semantic networks are expressed as semantic triples.

Semantic networks are used in natural language processing applications such as semantic parsing and word-sense disambiguation. Semantic networks can also be used as a method to analyze large texts and identify the main themes and topics (e.g., of social media posts), to reveal biases (e.g., in news coverage), or even to map an entire research field.

== History ==
Examples of the use of semantic networks in logic, directed acyclic graphs as a mnemonic tool, dates back centuries. The earliest documented use being the Greek philosopher Porphyry's commentary on Aristotle's categories in the third century AD.

In computing history, "Semantic Nets" for the propositional calculus were first implemented for computers by Richard H. Richens of the Cambridge Language Research Unit in 1956 as an "interlingua" for machine translation of natural languages. Although the importance of this work and the CLRU was only belatedly realized.

Semantic networks were also independently implemented by Robert F. Simmons and Sheldon Klein, using the first order predicate calculus as a base, after being inspired by a demonstration of Victor Yngve. The "line of research was originated by the first President of the Association [Association for Computational Linguistics], Victor Yngve, who in 1960 had published descriptions of algorithms for using a phrase structure grammar to generate syntactically well-formed nonsense sentences. Sheldon Klein and I about 1962-1964 were fascinated by the technique and generalized it to a method for controlling the sense of what was generated by respecting the semantic dependencies of words as they occurred in text." Other researchers, most notably M. Ross Quillian and others at System Development Corporation helped contribute to their work in the early 1960s as part of the SYNTHEX project. It's from these publications at SDC that most modern derivatives of the term "semantic network" cite as their background. Later prominent works were done by Allan M. Collins and Quillian (e.g., Collins and Quillian; Collins and Loftus Quillian). Still later in 2006, Hermann Helbig fully described MultiNet.

In the late 1980s, two Netherlands universities, Groningen and Twente, jointly began a project called Knowledge Graphs, which are semantic networks but with the added constraint that edges are restricted to be from a limited set of possible relations, to facilitate algebras on the graph. In the subsequent decades, the distinction between semantic networks and knowledge graphs was blurred. In 2012, Google gave their knowledge graph the name Knowledge Graph. The Semantic Link Network was systematically studied as a social semantics networking method. Its basic model consists of semantic nodes, semantic links between nodes, and a semantic space that defines the semantics of nodes and links and reasoning rules on semantic links. The systematic theory and model was published in 2004. This research direction can trace to the definition of inheritance rules for efficient model retrieval in 1998 and the Active Document Framework ADF. Since 2003, research has developed toward social semantic networking. This work is a systematic innovation at the age of the World Wide Web and global social networking rather than an application or simple extension of the Semantic Net (Network). Its purpose and scope are different from that of the Semantic Net (or network). The rules for reasoning and evolution and automatic discovery of implicit links play an important role in the Semantic Link Network. Recently it has been developed to support Cyber-Physical-Social Intelligence. It was used for creating a general summarization method. The self-organised Semantic Link Network was integrated with a multi-dimensional category space to form a semantic space to support advanced applications with multi-dimensional abstractions and self-organised semantic links It has been verified that Semantic Link Network play an important role in understanding and representation through text summarisation applications. Semantic Link Network has been extended from cyberspace to cyber-physical-social space. Competition relation and symbiosis relation as well as their roles in evolving society were studied in the emerging topic: Cyber-Physical-Social Intelligence

More specialized forms of semantic networks has been created for specific use. For example, in 2008, Fawsy Bendeck's PhD thesis formalized the Semantic Similarity Network (SSN) that contains specialized relationships and propagation algorithms to simplify the semantic similarity representation and calculations.

== Basics of semantic networks ==
A semantic network is used when one has knowledge that is best understood as a set of concepts that are related to one another.

Most semantic networks are cognitively based. They also consist of arcs and nodes which can be organized into a taxonomic hierarchy. Semantic networks contributed ideas of spreading activation, inheritance, and nodes as proto-objects.

== Examples ==
=== In Lisp ===
The following code shows an example of a semantic network in the Lisp programming language using an association list.

(setq *database*
'((canary  (is-a bird)
           (color yellow)
           (size small))
  (penguin (is-a bird)
           (movement swim))
  (bird    (is-a vertebrate)
           (has-part wings)
           (reproduction egg-laying))))

To extract all the information about the "canary" type, one would use the assoc function with a key of "canary".

=== WordNet ===
An example of a semantic network is WordNet, a lexical database of English. It groups English words into sets of synonyms called synsets, provides short, general definitions, and records the various semantic relations between these synonym sets. Some of the most common semantic relations defined are meronymy (A is a meronym of B if A is part of B), holonymy (B is a holonym of A if B contains A), hyponymy (or troponymy) (A is subordinate of B; A is kind of B), hypernymy (A is superordinate of B), synonymy (A denotes the same as B) and antonymy (A denotes the opposite of B).

WordNet properties have been studied from a network theory perspective and compared to other semantic networks created from Roget's Thesaurus and word association tasks. From this perspective the three of them are a small world structure.

=== Other examples ===
It is also possible to represent logical descriptions using semantic networks such as the existential graphs of Charles Sanders Peirce or the related conceptual graphs of John F. Sowa. These have expressive power equal to or exceeding standard first-order predicate logic. Unlike WordNet or other lexical or browsing networks, semantic networks using these representations can be used for reliable automated logical deduction. Some automated reasoners exploit the graph-theoretic features of the networks during processing.

Other examples of semantic networks are Gellish models. Gellish English with its Gellish English dictionary, is a formal language that is defined as a network of relations between concepts and names of concepts. Gellish English is a formal subset of natural English, just as Gellish Dutch is a formal subset of Dutch, whereas multiple languages share the same concepts. Other Gellish networks consist of knowledge models and information models that are expressed in the Gellish language. A Gellish network is a network of (binary) relations between things. Each relation in the network is an expression of a fact that is classified by a relation type. Each relation type itself is a concept that is defined in the Gellish language dictionary. Each related thing is either a concept or an individual thing that is classified by a concept. The definitions of concepts are created in the form of definition models (definition networks) that together form a Gellish Dictionary. A Gellish network can be documented in a Gellish database and is computer interpretable.

SciCrunch is a collaboratively edited knowledge base for scientific resources. It provides unambiguous identifiers (Research Resource IDentifiers or RRIDs) for software, lab tools etc. and it also provides options to create links between RRIDs and from communities.

Another example of semantic networks, based on category theory, is ologs. Here each type is an object, representing a set of things, and each arrow is a morphism, representing a function. Commutative diagrams also are prescribed to constrain the semantics.

In the social sciences people sometimes use the term semantic network to refer to co-occurrence networks.

== Software tools ==
There are also elaborate types of semantic networks connected with corresponding sets of software tools used for lexical knowledge engineering, like the Semantic Network Processing System (SNePS) of Stuart C. Shapiro or the MultiNet paradigm of Hermann Helbig, especially suited for the semantic representation of natural language expressions and used in several NLP applications.

Semantic networks are used in specialized information retrieval tasks, such as plagiarism detection. They provide information on hierarchical relations in order to employ semantic compression to reduce language diversity and enable the system to match word meanings, independently from sets of words used.

The Knowledge Graph proposed by Google in 2012 is actually an application of semantic network in search engine.

Modeling multi-relational data like semantic networks in low-dimensional spaces through forms of embedding has benefits in expressing entity relationships as well as extracting relations from mediums like text. There are many approaches to learning these embeddings, notably using Bayesian clustering frameworks or energy-based frameworks, and more recently, TransE (NIPS 2013). Applications of embedding knowledge base data include Social network analysis and Relationship extraction.

== See also ==
- Abstract semantic graph
- Chunking (psychology)
- CmapTools
- Concept map
- Network diagram
- Ontology (information science)
- Repertory grid
- Semantic lexicon
- Semantic similarity network
- Semantic neural network
- SemEval – an ongoing series of evaluations of computational semantic analysis systems
- Sparse distributed memory
- Taxonomy (general)
- Unified Medical Language System (UMLS)
- Word-sense disambiguation (WSD)
- Resource Description Framework

=== Other examples ===
- Cognition Network Technology
- Lexipedia
- OpenCog
- Open Mind Common Sense (OMCS)
- Schema.org
- SNOMED CT
- Universal Networking Language (UNL)
- Wikidata
- Freebase
