= Reporting of child pornography images on Wikimedia Commons =

2010 incident by Larry Sanger to the FBI targeting Wikimedia Commons

On April 7, 2010, Larry Sanger, co-founder of Wikipedia, sent a letter to the U.S. Federal Bureau of Investigation (FBI) stating that Wikimedia Commons was hosting child pornography, contrary to Title 18 of the United States Code. His accusations focused on images in the "lolicon" and "pedophilia" categories, the latter of which contained explicit drawings of sexual acts between adults and children by French artist Martin van Maële (1863–1926).

Shortly after Sanger posted the letter in public, criticism came in from multiple sources. This ranged from assertions that he had mislabeled lolicon as child pornography to the contention that his actions were an attack on the Wikimedia Foundation, caused by his history with Wikipedia and his own competing online encyclopedia, Citizendium. Sanger denied that the letter was an attempt to undermine Wikipedia, but did confirm it was an attempt to force a policy change for labeling or eliminating "adult" content on Wikipedia.

Wider attention was received when Fox News began reporting on the issue. In response Jimmy Wales, co-founder of Wikipedia, and other administrators began deleting images en masse, with Fox News reporting that a new policy change was underway. Days later Wales voluntarily relinquished his administrative powers on Commons under heavy criticism from the Wikimedia community. Fox News also received criticism for its handling of the reporting, especially for misrepresenting the situation regarding the self removal of administrative powers by Wales as leaving the Foundation without clear leadership.

== Reporting ==
On April 7, 2010, Larry Sanger sent a letter to the FBI, United States Senators, and Representatives saying that Wikimedia Commons hosted child pornography in the "lolicon" and "pedophilia" categories. He later acknowledged that the term "child pornography" may have been misleading because to many people it denotes images of real children and said that with the benefit of hindsight, he would have used the phrase "depictions of child sexual abuse" instead. According to section 1466A(2)(A) of Title 18 of the United States Code, "obscene visual representations of the sexual abuse of children" can be "a visual depiction of any kind, including a drawing, cartoon, sculpture, or painting", and anyone who "knowingly produces, distributes, receives, or possesses with intent to distribute, a visual depiction" of this kind is subject to legal penalties. Section 1466 specifically states, "It is not a required element of any offense under this section that the minor depicted actually exist."

Media in the Wikimedia Commons pedophilia category include graphic drawings of child sexual abuse by French illustrator Martin van Maele. Sanger's opinion was that the content violated section 1466A(2)(A), although the Wikimedia Foundation might argue that the media were exempted per section 1466A(2)(B), which refers to an image that has "serious literary, artistic, political, or scientific value". Sanger referred to an online discussion between educational technologists reporting that filtering software was not picking up the images, making them accessible to children in schools, and stated that this discussion was what first made him aware of the issue. Sanger said that he felt both morally and legally obligated to report the presence of these media, because the statutes implied that once aware of such content, one had to do so or risk prosecution oneself.

== Wikimedia's responses ==
Mike Godwin, general counsel for the Wikimedia Foundation, denied Sanger's claims. Godwin said that Sanger committed a typical layman's error in trying to invoke statutory law without adequate research, confusing several sections of Title 18. Section 1466A, the section invoked by Sanger, does not deal with child pornography, but with obscenity, while child pornography is addressed in section 2252. Godwin further defended the Foundation by citing Miller v. California which, according to The Register, emphasizes "the importance of community standards in defining what qualifies as obscenity". He also pointed out that the Foundation's projects are created by web users, and cited Section 230 of the Communications Decency Act – something he notes U.S. Federal obscenity and child-pornography statutes make a similar exception for.

Wikipedian spokesman Jay Walsh said that the Foundation does not harbor illegal material and any such material uploaded by volunteers would be removed.

== Sanger's response ==
Sanger, a self-described libertarian and moralist, stood by his actions and said, "pretending that it's just obvious, even for libertarians, that we have a right to publish such depictions is simply wrong, in my opinion". He told The Register, "If I [did]n't report this – and it's been up for years, apparently – who will? As the co-founder of the project, I believe I have a special personal obligation to rein in egregious wrongdoing when I see it. Or at least try. It bothers me that something I helped start has come to this."

After the report, several allegations were made against Sanger and picked up by sites such as Slashdot: that this was an attempt to destroy the Wikimedia Foundation; that there was a conflict of interest in his reporting; and that he listed his own websites in the letter, among others. In response to his actions being seen as an attempt by him to destroy the Wikimedia Foundation, Sanger commented that this was not true; although he hoped that by making things public the Foundation could be forcibly persuaded to eliminate or label content as "adult", so that filtering software would pick it up and more schools would allow Wikipedia. On the allegations that the reporting was a conflict of interest Sanger comments that, while he once worked for Wikipedia and was currently running a site in competing against it, the reporting probably did more harm to his personal career. He also contends that he was required by law to make the report, although the manner in which he chose to do so was not.

Sanger also responded to one specific comment on Slashdot,

why should anyone care if someone masturbates to an image of a drawn child? If that gets his/her kicks so that the person can be a normal productive member of society, all's good, or at least should be good – no child is ever harmed, and the person has taken care of his/her urges.

— unnamed poster according to Larry Sanger, Slashdot

In his response Sanger said he found the response chilling and disparaged the community for rating the comment as "Score: 5, Interesting". Sanger went on to criticize the industry by stating,

[the] high rating is chilling because it indicates that one of the most influential sectors of industry today, the geek sector in control of the most massive media production system in history, ... is steadfastly non-judgmental when it comes to someone who all but admits that he gets his 'kicks' by masturbating to an image of a drawn child. It's that attitude that explains why Category:Pedophilia and its contents exists on Wikimedia Commons. Such people should not be making policy for the seventh most popular website in the world.

— Larry Sanger, Slashdot

=== Sanger's relations with Wikimedia ===
Sanger is one of the co-founders of Wikipedia, but resigned on March 1, 2002. In September 2006 he founded Citizendium, a competitor to Wikipedia. While Sanger has gone on the record that this was not an attack on Wikipedia, nor a way to boost readership of his own free web-based collaborative encyclopedia, there is a significant level of skepticism that Sanger acted without malice. Sanger has had an antagonistic history against Wikipedia since leaving, including criticism of Wikipedia co-founder Wales, and of the Wikipedia community: "The ... community had essentially been taken over by trolls to a great extent. That was a real problem, and Jimmy Wales absolutely refused to do anything about it."

== Image purge ==
On May 7, 2010, after Fox News had begun informing and putting pressure on dozens of companies that donate to the Wikimedia Foundation, they reported that the Wikimedia Foundation had begun purging its websites of thousands of pornographic images after co-founder of the Wikimedia Foundation Jimmy Wales had been contacted by several of those donors. Fox News also reported that, according to Wales, this was in preparation for a new policy regarding sexually explicit content. However, Wales later denied the shake-up and that the reporter had ever contacted him.

The purge led to infighting throughout the entire Wikimedia community. Contributors complained that the deletions were "undemocratic and taken too quickly" and could result in images with legitimate educational value being accidentally deleted. Fox News claimed that the situation quickly "devolved into an all-out war pitting board members against board members, and with top leadership sparring with lower level administrators". However, the Wikimedia Foundation responded that, while discussions had become intense, it was a normal part of the process.

On May 9, 2010, Jimmy Wales gave up some site privileges in response to protests by contributors who were angered over his deletion of images without consultation. He can no longer delete files, remove administrators, assign projects or edit protected content; however, he is still able to edit as a regular user. Wales had previously asked that such images be removed. Some of the images he and other administrators deleted were restored as they were deemed to have educational value. His stepping down was picked up by various media when Fox News quoted a source as saying that Wales' voluntary redaction of his administrative powers created "chaos" with no one clearly in charge. The Foundation later denied those claims and posted a response on their blog about co-founder Wales' role in the Wikimedia Foundation. They clarified Wales' position as Chairman Emeritus of the Board of Trustees, noting that there were other executives with higher authority.

=== Criticism of Fox News coverage ===
Fox News was criticized for its handling of their reporting. In The Guardian, Godwin criticized the network, stating that Fox's releases were "part of its 'self-congratulatory anti-porn-on-the-Internet campaign'". Techdirt also criticized them for their lack of transparency, stating, "While Fox [News] of course plays up Sanger's Wikipedia credentials, they leave out the fact that he has been working on a failed competitor for years (they mention the company name, but not that it's a competitor). They also leave out much of the animosity between Sanger and Wikipedia." Fox News also improperly reported that Wales had a higher position in the Wikimedia Foundation and that his leaving caused a power vacuum. Wales said that the Fox News reporter, Jana Winter, who wrote the article on the alleged stepping down had never contacted him before publishing the article.

== See also ==
- Internet Watch Foundation and Wikipedia
