= WebExhibits =

- Website type: Virtual museum
- Available in: Multilingual, but predominately English
- Owner: IDEA.org
- Website: webexhibits.org
- Commercial: No
- Registration: No
- Launched: 1999; 27 years ago
- Current status: Online

WebExhibits is a virtual museum of science, humanities, and culture that uses information, virtual experiments, and hands-on activities that prompt visitors to think, to formulate questions, and to explore topics from a variety of angles.

== Exhibits ==
There are nine main exhibits. They are:

- "Causes of Color,"
- "Color Vision & Art,"
- "Pigments through the Ages,"
- "Investigating Bellini’s Feast of the Gods,"
- "Van Gogh’s Letters,"
- "Poetry through the Ages,"
- "Calendars through the Ages,"
- "Daylight Saving Time."
- "Butter,"

== History ==
It was founded in 1999 by Michael Douma at IDEA, and was one of the first virtual museums of its kind.

The site launched with two exhibits on Calendars and Daylight Saving Time, as a complement to www.time.gov. This was the anchor that started the museum. Subsequent exhibits were multidisciplinary, looking at the nexus between science and art. The largest sources of funding have been from contracts and grants from NIST, the U.S. Dept of Ed., and the National Science Foundation.

The first version of WebExhibits in 1999 included a directory of cultural and scientific offerings at other sites. At the time, the major search engines were doing a poor job of directing web users to exhibits at Library of Congress, PBS, Discovery Channel and other sites. This directory was discontinued in 2003 once search engines became powerful; and it was no longer feasible to include all major online exhibits.

The museum is widely cited in academic, student, professional, and general writing.

WebExhibits was the first testbed of interactive concept maps using the SpicyNodes presentation approach.

== Research ==
IDEA has published research on exhibit design and usability, and advocated for the format as an effective approach to draw in visitors to complex, multidisciplinary topics.
