= Internet Watch Foundation and Wikipedia =

Blacklist of Wikipedia in the UK

On 5 December 2008, the Internet Watch Foundation (IWF), a British watchdog group, blacklisted content on the English Wikipedia related to Scorpions' 1976 studio album Virgin Killer, due to the presence of its controversial cover artwork, depicting a ten-year-old girl posing nude, with a faux shattered-glass effect obscuring her genitalia. The image was deemed to be "potentially illegal content" under English law which forbids the possession or creation of indecent photographs of children. The IWF's blacklist is used in web filtering systems such as Cleanfeed.

The URL to the image's description page, which depicts the cover art, was also blacklisted; however, thumbnails and the image itself remained accessible. The album cover had been deemed controversial at the time of its release, and was replaced in some markets with an alternate cover image featuring a photo of the band members. The IWF described the image as "a potentially illegal indecent image of a child under the age of 18". Wikipedia's policies state that it does not censor content "that some readers consider objectionable or offensive, even exceedingly so", although it does remove content that is "obviously inappropriate", violates other Wikipedia policies, or is illegal in the United States.

As well as the direct consequence of censoring the article and image for UK-based readers of the English Wikipedia through the affected ISPs (a censoring that could be circumvented), and that the album cover was being made available unfiltered on other major sites including Amazon.co.uk (from which it was later removed), and available for sale in the UK, the action also had some indirect effects on Wikipedia, namely temporarily preventing all editors using said ISPs in the UK from contributing to any page of the encyclopedia, and preventing anonymous edits from these ISPs while the URL remained on the blacklist. This was described by the IWF as unintended "collateral damage". This was due to the proxies used to access Wikipedia, as Wikipedia implements a blocking policy whereby contributors can be blocked if they vandalise the encyclopedia. Therefore, all vandalism coming from one ISP would be directed through one proxy—hence one IP—and all of the ISP's customers using that proxy would be barred from editing.

After invoking its appeals procedure and reviewing the situation, the IWF reversed their blacklisting of the page on 9 December 2008, and announced that they would not blacklist other copies of the image hosted outside the UK.

== Background ==
The album art of the Scorpions' album Virgin Killer, featuring a young girl fully nude with a "smashed glass" effect covering her genitalia, was deemed controversial at the time of its release. The cover was replaced in some markets with an alternate cover image featuring a photo of the band members. RCA Records refused to sell the controversial album cover in the United States. The cover was not the only Scorpions cover which caused controversy, however, as the covers for Taken by Force and Lovedrive have also caused controversy with their content.

In the United Kingdom, access to illegal content (such as child pornography) was strictly self-regulated by individual internet service providers. This began when BT Group introduced Cleanfeed, a server-side filtering system which uses data obtained from the Internet Watch Foundation. The IWF is a quango organisation that operates a website where users can report web pages containing illegal or dubious content to be added to their blacklists. This was implemented in order to prevent users from accessing this material, since it is illegal to possess an indecent image of a child under the age of 18 per the Protection of Children Act. British ISPs were later obligated by the government to implement filters for illegal content by the beginning of 2007.

== Addition to IWF blacklist ==
On 5 December 2008 the Internet Watch Foundation added the Wikipedia URLs for the Virgin Killer article and the description page of the image to its blacklist. After the blacklisting, users of major UK ISPs, including BT, Vodafone, Virgin Media/Tesco.net, Be/O2, EasyNet/UK Online/Sky Broadband, Orange, Demon, and TalkTalk (Opal Telecom), were unable to access the content.

Sarah Robertson, director of communications for the IWF, said that the image was rated "1 on a scale of 1 to 5, where 1 is the least offensive". She described the picture as "erotic posing with no sexual activity". While the image itself has not been flagged as "illegal", IWF determined it to be a "potentially illegal indecent image of a child under the age of 18".

The IWF said they were first notified of the Wikipedia URL on 4 December 2008. This followed the May 2008 reporting of the cover image on Wikipedia by U.S.-based social conservative site WorldNetDaily to the Federal Bureau of Investigation. A subsequent investigation by the FBI concluded that the artwork did not violate any US laws. EContent magazine subsequently reported that the discussion page associated with the article declared "Prior discussion has determined by broad consensus that the Virgin Killer cover will not be removed", and asserted that Wikipedia contributors "favour inclusion in all but the most extreme cases". However, according to The Guardian because "the IWF doesn't talk to people outside of the UK they weren't able to appreciate what was going on". Internet security expert Richard Clayton explained that "We see this borderline stuff all the time; it's a no-win", before adding that the decision seems to have been based on taking the image out of context, particularly "given that you can go into HMV and buy a copy on the high street". On 9 December 2008 the IWF reversed its blacklist of the Wikipedia pages on the basis of the "contextual issues involved in this specific case and, in light of the length of time the image has existed and its wide availability".

== Effects on Wikipedia ==
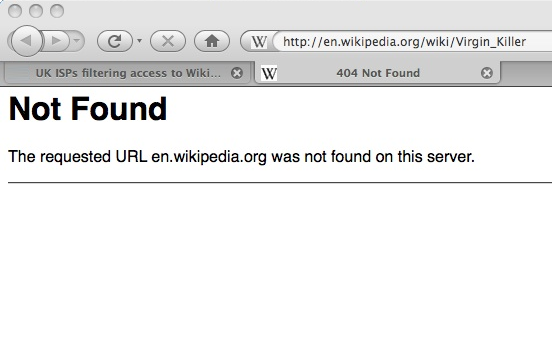
Users attempting to access the Virgin Killer article or image were met with pseudo-404 errors or other messages.

The blacklisting of Virgin Killer also caused other inadvertent issues for Wikipedia users in the United Kingdom. Usually most Internet users have a unique IP address visible to websites. However, as a result of ISPs using the IWF blacklist implemented through Cleanfeed technology, traffic to Wikipedia via those affected ISPs was then routed through a small number of proxy servers. This caused problems for users of the site. Since Wikipedia allows users to anonymously edit its encyclopedia articles, these individuals are identified only through their IP addresses, which are used to selectively block users who vandalise the site or otherwise break its rules. The proxy filtering makes it impossible to uniquely distinguish users, and to prevent vandalism Wikipedia "instituted a blanket ban on anonymous edits from the six ISPs, which account for 95% of British residential internet users". This had the immediate effect of requiring nearly all registered users in the UK to request the lifting of IP Autoblocks on their accounts before they could edit again, and the de facto permanent effect of barring any contribution from people without user accounts on the site, who contribute merely under an IP address and not a user name.

The MediaWiki software that Wikipedia runs on can interpret X-Forwarded-For (XFF) headers, allowing Wikipedia to identify a user's main IP address rather than the proxy IP address, allowing the ability to block proxy users individually by their client's IP rather than the proxy server IP (avoiding the need to block the whole proxy due to the actions of a single user). However, none of the ISPs subscribing to this system pass XFF information to Wikipedia, having the impact of reversing the normal method of identification and blocking on Wikipedia. IP addresses assumed to be assigned to an individual person or organisation were assigned instead to millions of people and thousands of registered editors. Wikipedia servers saw them all as the IP of the proxy rather than each as the IP of their own machine.

Due to erroneous use of Border Gateway Protocol (BGP) and other routing technology to redirect the connections to the filtering proxies, users of some networks were temporarily prevented from accessing or editing any content hosted by Wikimedia, a problem reminiscent of Pakistan's accidental blocking of YouTube for much of the world instead of only their own citizens.

== Responses ==
On 7 December 2008, the Wikimedia Foundation, the non-profit organisation that supports Wikipedia, issued a press release about the blacklisting of their sites by the IWF stating that they had "no reason to believe the article, or the image contained in the article, has been held to be illegal in any jurisdiction anywhere in the world", and noting that not just the image but the article itself had been blocked.

On 9 December 2008, Jimmy Wales, co-founder of Wikipedia, who then held the "community founder seat" on the Wikimedia Foundation Board of Trustees, told the UK's Channel 4 News that he had briefly considered legal action. After the block had been removed, Mike Godwin, general counsel for the Wikimedia Foundation, stated "there is still plenty to be troubled by in the operations of the Internet Watch Foundation and its blacklist".

On 9 December 2008, the IWF rescinded the block, issuing the following statement:

[...] the image in question is potentially in breach of the Protection of Children Act 1978. However, the IWF Board has today (9 December 2008) considered these findings and the contextual issues involved in this specific case and, in light of the length of time the image has existed and its wide availability, the decision has been taken to remove this webpage from our list.

== Aftermath ==
The incident was commented in some countries implementing or considering to implement Internet filtering or censorship plans. In Australia, Electronic Frontiers Australia vice-chairman Colin Jacobs said that "[the] incident in Britain, in which virtually the entire country was unable to edit Wikipedia because the country's Internet Watch Foundation had blacklisted a single image on the site, illustrated the pitfalls of mandatory ISP filtering". The Sydney Morning Herald has commented that "Ironically, the banning of the image has only made it visible to more people as news sites publicise the issue and the image spreads across sites other than Wikipedia" (an example of the Streisand effect).

At the time of the incident Amazon US were also displaying the image on their site and the IWF stated that it "might yet add Amazon US to its list of 'blocked' sites for hosting the picture"; however, Amazon subsequently took the decision to remove the image from their site. In an impact study preparing a bill dealing with cybercrime, the Cabinet of France listed the Virgin Killer block as an example of indiscriminate filtering.

The Electronic Frontier Foundation criticised the IWF's reasoning:

We agree with their decision [to reverse the ban], but they have the wrong reasoning [for the reversal]: they had no business censoring that article in the first place — the community of Wikipedia editors is if anything the more legitimate, reliable and grown-up adjudicator of which images are appropriate subject matter for an encyclopaedia.

The IWF continues to assert that the image is indeed child pornography, and asserts that the image would be blocked if it were on a British server.

== See also ==
- Reporting of child pornography images on Wikimedia Commons
- Internet censorship in the United Kingdom
- List of websites blocked in the United Kingdom
- List of Wikipedia controversies
