= Discovr =

Discovr was a series of apps for the Apple iOS platform by David McKinney, characterized by using nodes to represent relationships between media in a tactile and visual way. There are apps for browsing music, movies, and other apps.

In October 2011, Discovr announced that the apps had passed one million downloads and $1.1 million in revenue.

As of 2020, only the Discovr Music app was still in operation. As of 2024, all Discovr apps are gone from the App Store.

== Operation ==
The user interface is based on radial layouts where a node is connected to 1-6 other nodes. It displays an interactive, graphic map. The user begins by searching or browsing a pre-selected set of recommended items. Tapping causes a node to expand, to display related items. Double-tapping takes the user to a page of content about the artist or app. The interface uses a force-based layout algorithm which causes the new child nodes to pop out of the parent node, repelling nearby nodes, and quickly settle into positions that minimize overlap. The graph algorithm was developed by Tamás Nepusz, a PhD in graph theory who previously worked at Last.fm as a research engineer.

== See also ==
- Radial tree – the general type of layout algorithm
