= Transition (linguistics) =

Concept in linguistics

A transition or linking word is a word or phrase that shows the relationship between paragraphs or sections of a text or speech. Transitions provide greater cohesion by making it more explicit or signaling how ideas relate to one another. Transitions are, in fact, "bridges" that "carry a reader from section to section". Transitions guide a reader/listener through steps of logic, increments of time, or through physical space. Transitions "connect words and ideas so that [...] readers don't have to do the mental work for [themselves]."

Transitions reveal the internal structure of an author's reasoning. While they are used primarily for rhetoric, they are also used in a strictly grammatical sense for structural composition, reasoning, and comprehension. Indeed, they are an essential part of any language.

In simple terms, a transition word demonstrates the relationship between two portions of a text or spoken language. By using these words, people can better build a sentence and convey what they are trying to say in a more concise manner.

== Categories ==
Transition words and phrases categories include: Conclusion, Continuation, Contrast, Emphasis, Evidence, Illustration and Sequence. Each category serves its own function, as do the keywords inside of a given category.

Type	Signals	Examples
Conclusion or Causality	a summation of information	therefore; thus; in conclusion; believes; so; consequently; it can be seen that; can conclude that; claims that; all in all;
Continuation	more support for the same claim is coming up	and; also; moreover; furthermore; plus; in addition; at the same time; as well as; equally;besides; what is more; both...and; equally important; not only...but also
Contrast	a comparison of similarities and differences	but; despite; yet; however; alternatively; still; although; unless; otherwise; not; though; while; nevertheless; by contrast; notwithstanding; rather; conversely; in spite of; on the other hand; contrarily
Emphasis	what is considered important	I think; above all; essentially; clearly; most of all; especially; primarily; particularly; in large measure; indeed;
Evidence	an upcoming background	because; for; since; the reason is that;
Illustration/Exemplification	an example is being given as support for a claim.	for example; for instance; specifically; to illustrate; such as; In the words of; To "name"; For "name"; According to "name"; as "name" says,;
Sequence	there is a structure or order that has been formulated in the writing	Firstly,...,Secondly,...Thirdly,...Lastly; Next; Finally; On the one hand; Recently;

=== Coordinating transitions ===
Elements in a coordinate relationship are equal in rank, quality, or significance. They help to show a link between equal elements.

- To show similarity or reinforce: also, and, as well as, by the same token, comparatively, correspondingly, coupled with, equally, equally important, furthermore, identically, in the light of, in the same fashion/way, likewise, moreover, not only... but also, not to mention, similarly, to say nothing of, together with, too, uniquely
- To introduce an opposing point: besides, but, however, in contrast, neither, nevertheless, nor, on the contrary, on the other hand, still, yet
- To signal a restatement: in other words, in simpler terms, indeed, that is, to put it differently

=== Subordinating transitions ===
- To introduce an item in a series: finally, first, for another, for one thing, in addition, in the first place, in the second place, last, next, second, then
- To introduce an example: for example, for instance, in particular, namely, specifically, that is
- To show causality: accordingly, as a result, because, consequently, for, hence, since, so, then, therefore, thus
- To introduce a summary or conclusion: actually, all in all, altogether, clearly, evidently, finally, in conclusion, of course, to sum up
- To signal a concession: certainly, granted, it is true, naturally, of course, to be sure
- To resume main argument after a concession: all the same, even though, nevertheless, nonetheless, still

=== Temporal transitions ===
- To show frequency: again and again, day after day, every so often, frequently, hourly, now and then, occasionally, often
- To show duration: briefly, during, for a long time, minute by minute, while
- To show a particular time: at six o'clock, at that time, first thing in the morning, in 1999, in the beginning of August, in those days, last Sunday, next Christmas, now, then, two months ago, when
- To introduce a beginning: at first, before then, in the beginning, since
- To introduce a middle: as it was happening, at that moment, at the same time, in the meantime, meanwhile, next, simultaneously, then
- To signal an end (or beyond): afterward/afterwards, at last, eventually, finally, in the end, later

=== Spatial transitions ===
- To show closeness: adjacent to, alongside, close to, facing, near, next to, side by side
- To show long distance: away, beyond, far, in the distance, there
- To show direction: above, across, along, away from, behind, below, down, in front of, inside, outside, sideways, to the left, to the right, toward/towards, up

=== Transition words of agreement, addition, or similarity ===
The transition words, such as also, in addition, and likewise, add information, reinforce ideas, and express agreement with preceding material.

- additionally
- again
- also
- and
- as
- as a matter of fact
- as well as
- by the same token
- comparatively
- correspondingly
- coupled with
- equally
- equally important
- first
- furthermore
- identically
- in addition
- in like manner
- in the first place
- in the light of
- in the same fashion/way
- like
- likewise
- moreover
- not only ... but also
- not to mention
- of course
- second
- similarly
- then
- third
- to
- to say nothing of
- together with
- too
- uniquely
- what's more

== See also ==
- Conjunction
- Level of measurement
- Concept map
