= Saundra McGuire =

American academic

Saundra Yancy McGuire
- Education: Southern University, Cornell University, University of Tennessee at Knoxville
- Awards: 2017 American Chemical Society (ACS) Award for Encouraging Disadvantaged Students into Careers in the Chemical Sciences 2017 [LSU] College of Science Hall of Distinction Inductee
- Scientific career
- Fields: Chemistry, Chemical Education
- Workplaces: Louisiana State University
- Thesis: An Exploratory Investigation of the Relationship Between Cerebral Dominance and Problem Solving Strategies Used by Selected High School Chemistry Students (1983)

Saundra Yancy McGuire is the Director Emerita of the Center for Academic Success and a retired professor of chemistry at Louisiana State University. She is best known for her work on science education, having written several papers and books on the subject. Her interests focus on improving student learning by involving faculty in metacognitive learning strategies.

== Education ==
She received her B.S. degree from Southern University, Baton Rouge, Louisiana, graduating magna cum laude. Upon graduation, she attended Cornell University and received her master's degree, advised by Joseph D. Novak. She received her Ph.D. from the University of Tennessee at Knoxville in 1983. There, she received the Chancellor's Citation for Exceptional Professional Promise.

== Employment ==
Prior to her employment at LSU, McGuire spent eleven years working at Cornell University. In this time, she earned the Clark Distinguished Teaching Award. She is the retired assistant vice chancellor and professor of chemistry at Louisiana State University. Her presentation record includes keynote addresses and workshops at over 250 institutions in 43 states and 8 countries, and covers topics such as learning, teaching strategies, and problem-solving guides for introductory chemistry.

== Awards ==
- 2019 Suanne Davis Roueche Distinguished Lecturer Award, National Institute for Staff and Organizational Development (NISOD)
- 2019 Commitment to Excellence in Academic Support Award, American College Personnel Association (ACPA
- 2017 American Chemical Society (ACS) Award for Encouraging Disadvantaged Students into Careers in the Chemical Sciences
- 2017 LSU College of Science Hall of Distinction Inductee
- 2017 Esprit de Femme Award, LSU Women's Center
- 2015 Lifetime Mentor Award, American Association for the Advancement of Science (AAAS)
- 2014 Lifetime Achievement Award, National Organization for the Professional Advancement of Black Chemists and Chemical Engineers (NOBCChE)
- 2013 Inaugural Dean's Visiting Scholar, College of Science, University of Cape Town, South Africa
- 2012 Inaugural Ronald O. Ragsdale Lecturer, Dept. of Chemistry, University of Utah
- 2012 Elected Fellow of the Council of Learning Assistance and Developmental Education Associations (CLADEA)
- 2011 Elected Fellow of AAAS
- 2011 Distinguished Teaching Award, College Reading and Learning Association (CRLA)
- 2010 Elected Fellow of ACS
- 2010 Awarded Lifetime Learning Center Leadership Certification by the National College Learning Center Association (NCLCA)
- 2008 Distinguished Alumna, Southern University Department of Chemistry
- 2007 Invited Speaker, ACS Presidential Symposium in Honor of Nobel Laureate Roald Hoffmann's 70th Birthday
- 2006 Presidential Award for Excellence in Science, Mathematics, and Engineering Mentoring (PAESMEM)
- 2002 Received the Outstanding Chemical Educator Award National Organization for Black Chemists and Chemical Engineers (NOBCChE)

== Personal life ==
McGuire is married to Professor Stephen C. McGuire, a professor of physics at Southern University. Together, they have two daughters: Carla McGuire Davis and Stephanie McGuire.
