= Mindnet =

Database of lexico-semantic relations

MindNet is the name of several automatically acquired databases of lexico-semantic relations developed by members of the Natural Language Processing Group at Microsoft Research during the 1990s. It is considered one of the world's largest lexicons and databases that could make automatic semantic descriptions along with WordNet, FrameNet, HowNet, and Integrated Linguistic Database. It is particularly distinguished from WordNet by the way it was created automatically from a dictionary.

MindNet was designed to be continuously extended. It was first built out of the Longman Dictionary of Contemporary English (LDOCE) and later included American Heritage and the full text of Microsoft Encarta. The system can analyze linguistic representations of arbitrary text. The underlying technology is based on the same parser used in the Microsoft Word grammar checker and was deployed in the natural language query engine in Microsoft's Encarta 99 encyclopedia.
