= Joseph D. Novak =

American educator (1930–2023)

Joseph Donald Novak (December 2, 1930 – September 22, 2023) was an American educator, and professor emeritus at the Cornell University, and senior research scientist at the Florida Institute for Human & Machine Cognition. He is known for his development of concept mapping in the 1970s.

== Biography ==
Joseph Novak received a B.S. in Science and Mathematics in 1952 from the University of Minnesota, an M.S. in Science Education in 1954 from the University of Minnesota, and completed his graduate studies in Science Education & Biology at the University of Minnesota in 1958.

Novak started teaching biology at Kansas State Teachers College at Emporia from 1957 to 1959, and biology and teacher education courses at Purdue University from 1959 to 1967. From 1967 to 1995, he was Professor of Education and Biological sciences at Cornell University. His students at Cornell included Saundra McGuire. Since 1998 he has also been Visiting Senior Scientist, at the University of West Florida, Institute for Human & Machine Cognition. He has consulted with more than 400 schools, universities, and corporations, including recent work with Procter and Gamble, NASA, the Department of the Navy, and EPRI.

Novak received a number of awards and honors including: a 1998 Honorary Doctorate from The University of Comahue, Neuquén, Argentina; a 2002 Honorary Doctorate from the Public University of Navarra, Pamplona, Spain; a 2006 Honorary Doctorate from the University of Urbino; and the first award for contributions to science education from the Council of Scientific Society Presidents.

Novak died on September 22, 2023, at the age of 92.

== Work ==
Novak's research focused on human learning, educational studies, and knowledge creation and representation. He has developed a theory of education to guide research and instruction, first published in 1977 and updated in 1998.

His latest research work includes studies on students' ideas on learning and epistemology, and methods of applying educational ideas and tools (such as concept mapping) in corporate settings and distance learning programs. Present work includes the development of "expert" concept maps to "scaffold" learning, using CMapping with Internet and other resources, providing A New Model for Education.

=== Concept mapping ===
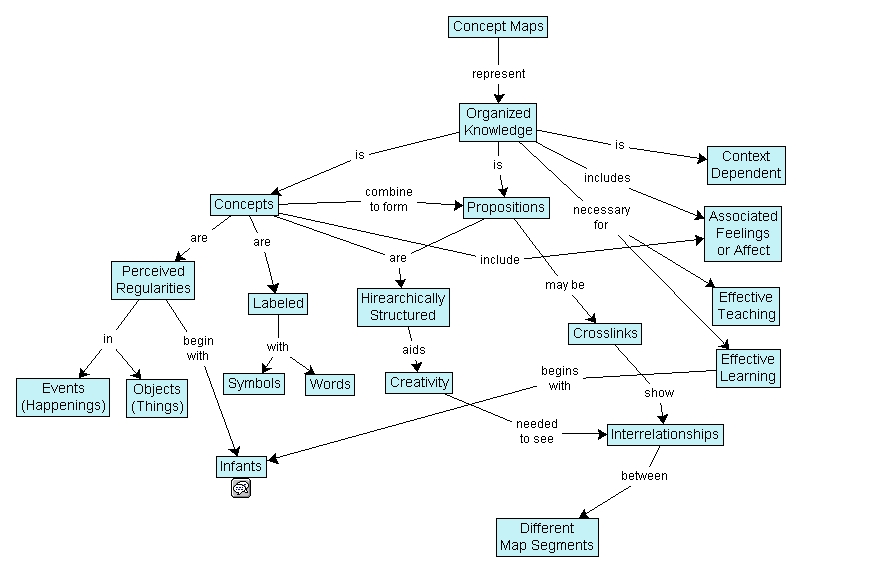
Example of a concept map, created using IHMC CmapTools.

Beginning in the 1970s, Novak and his research team at Cornell developed the technique of concept mapping as a means of representing the emerging science knowledge of students. It has subsequently been used as a tool to increase meaningful learning in the sciences and other subjects as well as to represent the expert knowledge of individuals and teams in education, government and business.

Concept maps have their origin in the learning movement called constructivism. Educational constructivists hold that learners actively construct knowledge. In his book, Learning How to Learn, Novak states that "meaningful learning involves the assimilation of new concepts and propositions into existing cognitive structures." In his research, Novak taught students as young as six years old to make concept maps to represent their response to focus questions such as "What is water?" and "What causes the seasons?"

Novak's work is based on the assimilation theory of cognitivist David Ausubel, who stressed the importance of prior knowledge in being able to learn new concepts.

"The most important single factor influencing learning is what the learner already knows. Ascertain this and teach accordingly."

In his work, Novak presents concept mapping as a valuable tool for educators in assessing the structure of student conceptions, both before and after an educational experience.

== Publications ==
Novak is author or coauthor of 27 books and more than 130 book chapters and papers in professional books and journals, among them:

- 1970. The improvement of biology teaching. Indianapolis, Bobbs-Merrill.
- 1973. A summary of research in science education for 1972. Columbus : Ohio State University, ERIC Information Analysis Center for Science, Mathematics, and Environmental Education.
- 1977. A theory of education. Ithaca, N.Y. : Cornell University Press, 1977.
- 1984. Learning How to Learn. With D.B. Gowin. Cambridge: Cambridge University Press.
- 1988. Teaching Science for Understanding. With J. Mintzes and J. Wandersee. San Diego, CA: Academic Press.
- 1996. Aprendizaje Significativo: Técnicas y Aplicaciones. With Fermin M. González. Serie: Educación y Futuro #18. Madrid (Spain): Ediciones Pedagógicas.
- 1998. Learning, Creating, and Using Knowledge: Concept maps as facilitative tools for schools and corporations. Mahwah, N.J.: Lawrence Erlbaum & Assoc.
- 2000. Assessing Science Understanding. With J. Mintzes and J. Wandersee. San Diego, CA: Academic Press
- 2001. Errores Conceptuales: Diagnosis, Tratamiento Y Reflexiones. With Fermin González and Ciriaco Morón. Pamplona (Spain): Ediciones Eunate.
- 2004. Concept Maps: Theory, Methodology, Technology, Proceedings of the First International Conference on Concept Mapping, Pamplona, Spain (September 14–17, 2004). With A.J. Cañas, and Fermin M. González (Eds.). Editorial Universidad Pública de Navarra.
