= Lexipedia =

Online visual semantic network

- Website type: semantic network online dictionary online thesaurus
- Available in: English, Dutch, French, German, Italian, Spanish
- Owner: Vantage Learning
- Website: http://www.lexipedia.com/
- Launched: June 2007

Lexipedia is an online visual semantic network with dictionary and thesaurus reference functionality built on Vantage Learning's Multilingual ConceptNet. Lexipedia presents words with their semantic relationships displayed in an animated visual word web. Lexipedia contains an expanded version of the English Wordnet and supports six languages; English, Dutch, French, German, Italian, Spanish languages.
