= Hyperbolic tree =

Mathematical tree in the hyperbolic plane

A hyperbolic tree (often shortened as hypertree) is an information visualization and graph drawing method inspired by hyperbolic geometry.

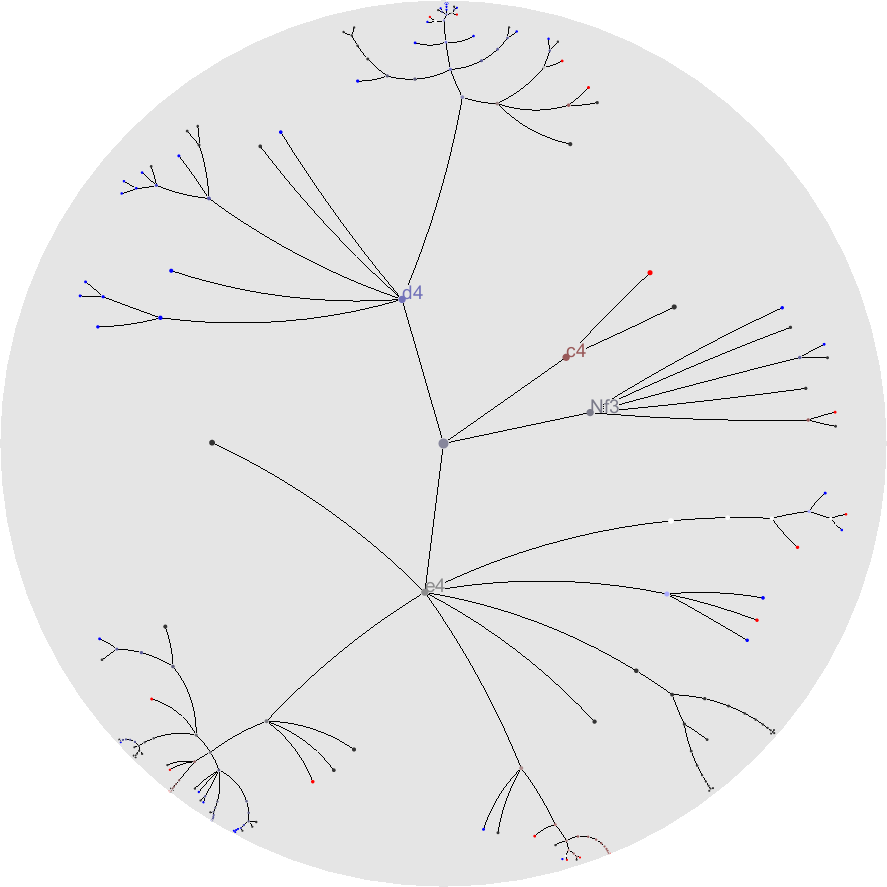
A basic hyperbolic tree. Nodes in focus are placed in the center and given more room, while out-of-focus nodes are compressed near the boundaries.

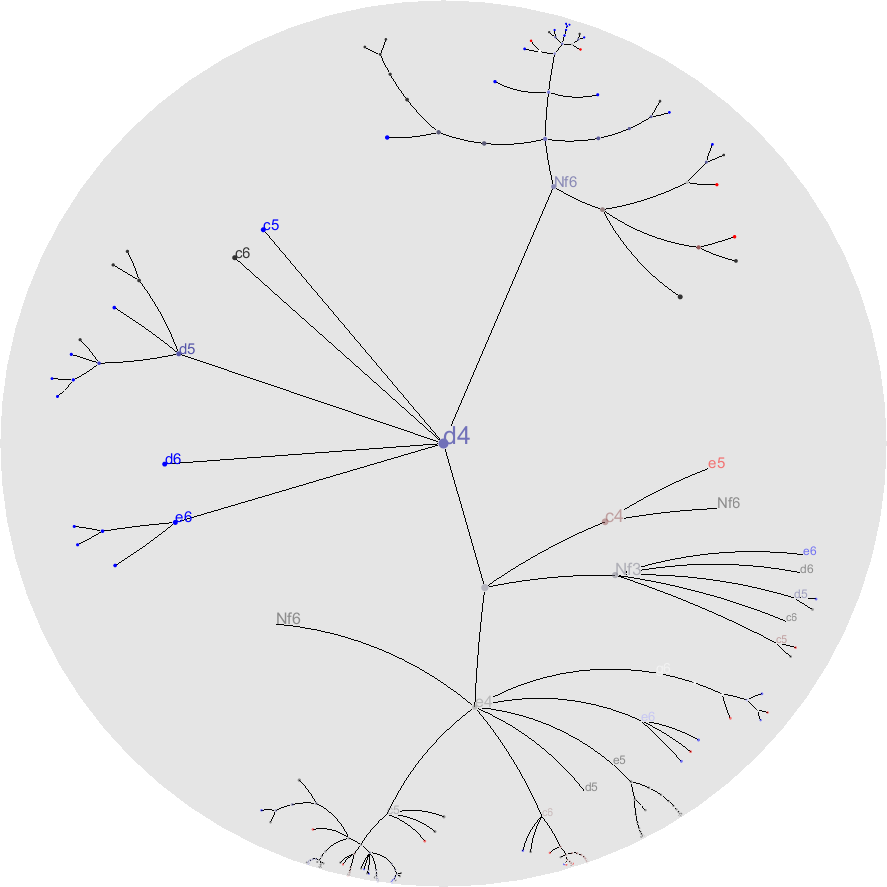
Focusing on a different node brings it and its children to the center of the disk, while uninteresting portions of the tree are compressed.

Displaying hierarchical data as a tree suffers from visual clutter as the number of nodes per level can grow exponentially. For a simple binary tree, the maximum number of nodes at a level n is 2^{n}, while the number of nodes for trees with more branching grows much more quickly. Drawing the tree as a node-link diagram thus requires exponential amounts of space to be displayed.

One approach is to use a hyperbolic tree, first introduced by Lamping et al. Hyperbolic trees employ hyperbolic space, which intrinsically has "more room" than Euclidean space. For instance, linearly increasing the radius of a circle in Euclidean space increases its circumference linearly, while the same circle in hyperbolic space would have its circumference increase exponentially. Exploiting this property allows laying out the tree in hyperbolic space in an uncluttered manner: placing a node far enough from its parent gives the node almost the same amount of space as its parent for laying out its own children.

Displaying a hyperbolic tree commonly utilizes the Poincaré disk model of hyperbolic geometry, though the Klein-Beltrami model can also be used. Both display the entire hyperbolic plane within a unit disk, making the entire tree visible at once. The unit disk gives a fish-eye lens view of the plane, giving more emphasis to nodes which are in focus and displaying nodes further out of focus closer to the boundary of the disk. Traversing the hyperbolic tree requires Möbius transformations of the space, bringing new nodes into focus and moving higher levels of the hierarchy out of view.

Hyperbolic trees were patented in the U.S. by Xerox in 1996, but the patent has since expired.

== See also ==
- Hyperbolic geometry
- Binary tiling
- Information visualization
- Radial tree – is also circular, but uses linear geometry.
- Tree (data structure)
- Tree (graph theory)
