= Concept map =

Diagram showing relationships among concepts

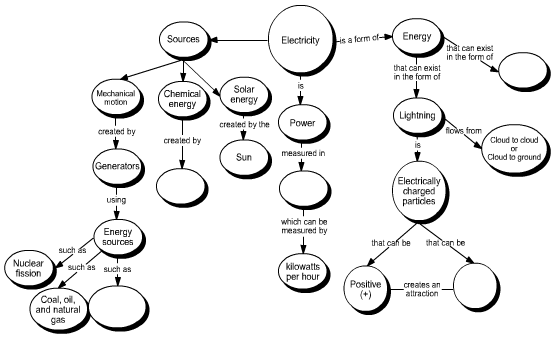
An example of a concept map about electricity

A concept map or conceptual diagram is a diagram that depicts suggested relationships between concepts. Concept maps are used by instructional designers, engineers, technical writers, and many others to organize and structure knowledge they want to graphically depict.

The concept map represents ideas and information as boxes or circles, connected with arrows that are labelled often in a downward-branching hierarchical structure. They can also be represented as free-form maps. The key to a concept map is linking the relationships between different concepts by using linking phrases such as "causes", "requires", "such as" or "contributes to" in a visual format called concept mapping.

Concept maps have been used to define the ontology of computer systems, as in object-role modeling or using Unified Modeling Language formalism.

== Differences from other visualizations ==
- Topic maps: Both concept maps and topic maps are kinds of knowledge graph, but topic maps were developed by information management professionals for semantic interoperability of data (originally book indices). Concept maps were developed by education professionals to support people's learning. In the words of concept-map researchers Joseph D. Novak and Bob Gowin, their approach to concept mapping is based on a "learning theory that focuses on concept and propositional learning as the basis on which individuals construct their own idiosyncratic meanings".
- Mind maps: Both concept maps and topic maps can be contrasted with mind mapping, which is restricted to a tree structure. Concept maps are free-form, with multiple independent hubs and clusters, unlike mind maps, which emerge from a single center.

== History ==
Concept mapping was developed by the professor of education Joseph D. Novak and his research team at Cornell University in the 1970s to represent the emerging science knowledge of students. It has subsequently been used to increase meaningful learning in the sciences and other subjects as well as to represent the expert knowledge of individuals and teams in education, government and business. Concept maps have their origin in the learning movement called constructivism. In particular, constructivists hold that learners actively construct, that is, create, knowledge.

Novak's work is based on the cognitive theories of David Ausubel, who stressed the importance of prior knowledge in being able to learn (or assimilate) new concepts: "The most important single factor influencing learning is what the learner already knows. Ascertain this and teach accordingly." Novak taught students as young as six years old to make concept maps to represent their response to focus questions such as "What is water?" "What causes the seasons?" In his book Learning How to Learn, Novak stated that a "meaningful learning involves the assimilation of new concepts and propositions into existing cognitive structures."

Various attempts have been made to conceptualize the creation of concept maps. McAleese suggested that making knowledge explicit, using nodes and relationships, allows the individual to become aware and realize what they know and as a result modify that knowledge. Maria Birbili applied the same idea to helping young children learn to think about what they know. McAleese's concept of the knowledge arena suggests a virtual space where learners may explore what they know and what they do not know.

== Use ==
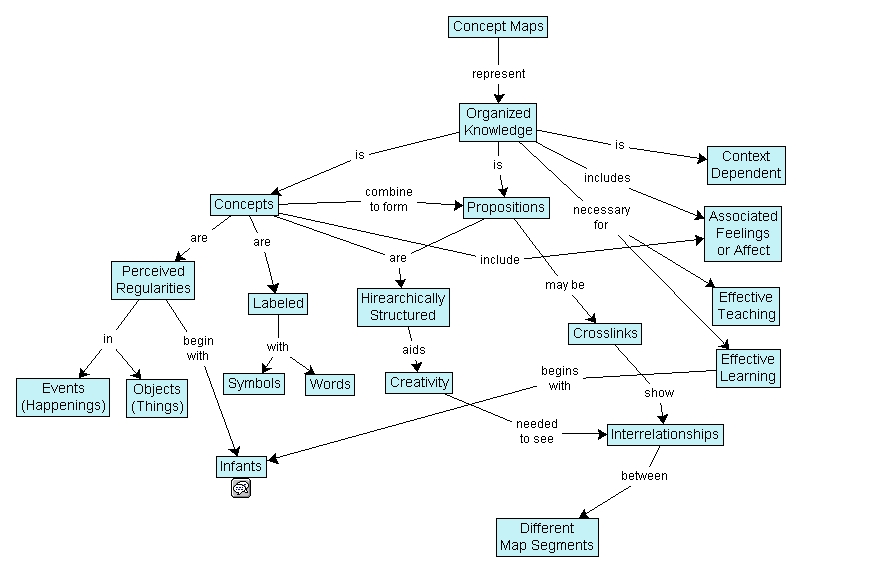
Example concept map created using the IHMC CmapTools computer program

Concept maps are used to stimulate the generation of ideas, and are believed to aid creativity. Concept mapping is also sometimes used for brain-storming. Although they are often personalized and idiosyncratic, concept maps can be used to communicate complex ideas.

Formalized concept maps are used in software design, where a common usage is Unified Modeling Language diagramming amongst similar conventions and development methodologies.

Concept mapping can also be seen as a first step in ontology-building, and can also be used flexibly to represent formal argument — similar to argument maps.

Concept maps are widely used in education and business. Uses include:

- Note taking and summarizing gleaning key concepts, their relationships and hierarchy from documents and source materials
- New knowledge creation: e.g., transforming tacit knowledge into an organizational resource, mapping team knowledge
- Institutional knowledge preservation (retention), e.g., eliciting and mapping expert knowledge of employees prior to retirement
- Collaborative knowledge modeling and the transfer of expert knowledge
- Facilitating the creation of shared vision and shared understanding within a team or organization
- Instructional design: concept maps used as Ausubelian "advance organizers" that provide an initial conceptual frame for subsequent information and learning.
- Training: concept maps used as Ausubelian "advanced organizers" to represent the training context and its relationship to their jobs, to the organization's strategic objectives, to training goals.
- Communicating complex ideas and arguments
- Examining the symmetry of complex ideas and arguments and associated terminology
- Detailing the entire structure of an idea, train of thought, or line of argument (with the specific goal of exposing faults, errors, or gaps in one's own reasoning) for the scrutiny of others.
- Enhancing metacognition (learning to learn, and thinking about knowledge)
- Improving language ability
- Assessing learner understanding of learning objectives, concepts, and the relationship among those concepts
- Lexicon development

== See also ==
- Cluster analysis – Grouping a set of objects by similarity
- Concept inventory – Knowledge assessment tool
- Conceptual framework – Method of organizing information
- Group concept mapping – Method of organizing groups of related concepts
- Information model – Software engineering visualization
- Level of measurement – Distinction between nominal, ordinal, interval and ratio variables
- List of concept- and mind-mapping software
- Nomological network – Representation of concepts and relationships between concepts
- Personal knowledge base – Knowledge management software
- Rhizome (philosophy) – Philosophical model of the connections present in an assemblage
- Semantic network – Knowledge base that represents semantic relations between concepts in a network
- Spider mapping – Diagram to visually organize information and show relationships between ideas
