= NewWave =

1988 graphical desktop environment by Hewlett-Packard

HP NewWave
- HP NewWave Office v4.1 default desktop
- Developer: Hewlett-Packard
- Release: 1988; 38 years ago
- Stable release: HP NewWave Office v4.5 / 18 July 1995; 31 years ago
- Operating system: Microsoft Windows
- Type: Desktop environment
- License: Proprietary EULA

NewWave is a discontinued object-oriented graphical desktop environment and office productivity tool for PCs running early versions of Microsoft Windows (beginning with 2.0). It was developed by Hewlett-Packard and introduced commercially in 1988. It was used on the HP Vectras and other IBM-compatible PCs running Windows.

From a user perspective NewWave ran on top of Windows and completely replaced the standard Windows Desktop and Program Manager user interface with its own object-oriented desktop interface.

HP promoted NewWave until the release of Windows 95, at which time further development of the product ceased due to incompatibility with the new operating system. The NewWave GUI (together with the contemporaneous NeXTSTEP GUI) introduced the shaded "3-D look and feel" that was later widely adopted.

HP encouraged independent software vendors to produce versions of applications which took advantage of NewWave functionality, allowing their data to be handled as objects instead of files. One early example was Samna Corporation (later acquired by Lotus) who produced an edition of their Microsoft Windows word processor Ami Pro entitled "Ami Pro for NewWave". On June 20, 1988 Microsoft Corporation and Hewlett-Packard issued a press release announcing the inclusion of NewWave support in an up-coming release Microsoft Excel.

NewWave featured icons, scheduled scripts in the form of "agents", and "hot connects."

HP incorporated NewWave into their multi-platform office automation offerings running under their proprietary MPE and HP-UX (UNIX) minicomputer operating systems. They developed NewWave versions of key email, database, document management, personal productivity, communications and network management tools and branded all related solutions under the “HP NewWave Office” banner. Prior to the integration of HP NewWave this solution set had been known as “Business System Plus”. The “NewWave Office” term had been used previously to describe the main NewWave user desktop.

== Overview ==
"The Hewlett-Packard NewWave Developer Products" brochure from October 1987

"Preparing for the Future with the HP NewWave Environment" brochure from November 1987

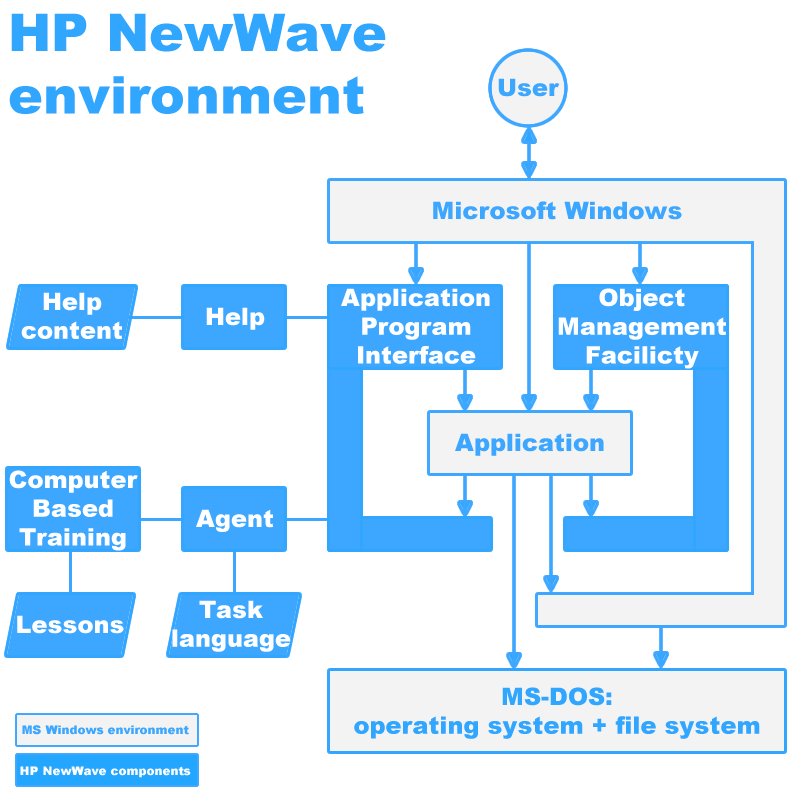
HP NewWave v1 environment block diagram

In its original November 1987 press release Hewlett-Packard described NewWave as “an application environment designed to provide personal computer users with a single method to access data and files from multiple sources on a company’s network”. It was developed by HP’s Personal Software Division (PSD) in Santa Clara, California, United States, as part of their distributed computing environment strategy, after three years of work by more than 100 employees.

The original version of NewWave ran on IBM-compatible PCs and required MS-DOS 3.2 or later and Windows 2.0 or later.

Key features of NewWave included:

- An icon-based user interface.
- An Object Management Facility (OMF) which completely replaced the MS-DOS / Windows file-based system.
- “Hot connects” - ensuring data changed in one file are automatically updated in related files in which those data are used.
- Agents, based on artificial intelligence (AI) principles, which could be set to perform routing activities such as gathering data from various computers to create a monthly sales report. Agents could follow a procedure carried out by an end-user and remember it so it could be repeated at a specified time or executed under certain conditions.

=== Pricing ===
- HP NewWave Developers Kit - released February 1988: $895 (US)
- HP NewWave end-user version - released second-half 1988: $195 (US)

=== Object Management Facility (OMF) ===
HP described the OMF as a means of binding applications and data together to form “objects”, such as compound documents.

=== Contextual online help ===
In addition to MS-Windows-style indexed help articles NewWave introduced a context-sensitive help facility. This allowed a user to click on a ‘Help’ menu option which added a query symbol to the mouse arrow; once switched into this ‘help mode’ the user could click on any part of the NewWave environment or any menu command to have the help for that item displayed in a pop-up window.

=== Computer-based training ===
Working in conjunction with the NewWave Agent the computer-based training functionality of NewWave allowed developers to build interactive lessons into the desktop environment and the applications themselves. This allowed users to learn with actual live applications in a non-destructive way. The feature was dropped in later versions of NewWave due to the increased disk requirements it imposed and the limited hard disk space available in PCs of the time.

=== Agent ===
The NewWave Agent was a task-recording and execution facility, which could work across multiple applications. Users could record any sequence of tasks performed within the NewWave environment. Recorded tasks generated a BASIC-like source-code, which could be repeated unmodified, or edited and expanded to create sophisticated automated and interactive activities.

=== Built-in and bridged applications ===
NewWave included some built-in applications, which were fully integrated with the Object Management Facility, NewWave Agent, Online Help and Computer Based Training features. Non-native NewWave applications could be integrated into the environment using “advanced bridges”, allowing their live data to be embedded in compound documents. The standard end-user version of HP NewWave included bridges for HP’s own PC applications, such as HP Graphics gallery, MS Windows tools (calculator, calendar, notepad etc.) and many common third-party applications. Users could also create their own bridges to other applications using the included Bridge Builder tool. Bridges could be exported for use on other NewWave-enabled systems and were often shared amongst the NewWave user community.

==== NewWave Write ====
HP described NewWave Write as a basic-to-intermediate level “what you see is what you get” (WYSIWIG) word processor with support for compound documents.

==== NewWave Mail ====
NewWave Mail was available as a separate native NewWave product, which could act as a client to HP’s proprietary DeskManager and OpenMail email server solutions.

==== Third-party applications ====
HP succeeded in establishing a third-party developer program following the release of the NewWave Software Developer’s Kit (SDK) in February 1988.

NewWave enabled third-party applications included:

Application	Vendor	Description
1-2-3 Version 2.2	Lotus Development Corporation	Spreadsheet application.
ABC FlowCharter	Roykore Inc	Flowcharting application
Ami and Ami Professional	Samna Corporation	Intermediate and advanced full-feature word processing packages.
Business Session	Tymlabs Corporation	Terminal emulation and communications with scripting.
Charisma	Micrografx Inc.	Business charting and graphing tool.
Da Vinci eMAIL	Da Vinci Systems	LAN-based electronic mail.
DynaComm	Future Soft Engineering Inc.	PC-to-host dynamic communications with scripting automation.
Excel	Microsoft Corporation	Spreadsheet.
Forest & Trees	Channel Computing	Intelligent database.
IconArtist	AimTech Corporation	Graphics paint program.
IconAuthor	AimTech Corporation	Icon-based development tool for creating multimedia applications.
INERTIA	Modern Computer Aided Engineering Inc.	Computer Aided Engineering (CAE) solution.
MicroView Fax	Microview Inc.	Multi-user networked fax solution.
PowerPlay	Cognos Corporation	Graphical management reporting tool.
Transactor	Systems Interface Inc.	UNIX communications and decision support.
VideoWindows NW	New media Graphics	Full-motion video integration.

==== NewWave bridged third-party applications ====
Third-party application bridges shipped with the end-user release of HP NewWave included:

Application	Vendor	Description
1-2-3 Rel.2.01	Lotus Development Corporation	Spreadsheet.
Ami 1.0	Samna Corporation	Word processor.
Excel 2.1	Microsoft Corporation	Spreadsheet.
MultiMate Advantage II 1.0	Multimate International	Word processing package.
PageMaker 3.0	Aldus Corporation	Desktop publishing package.
Paint	Microsoft Corporation	Simple graphics tool.
Quattro	Borland Software Corporation	Spreadsheet.
VP Planner Plus	Stephenson Software Inc.	Database.
WordPerfect 4.2 / 5.0 / 5.1	WordPerfect Corporation	Word processing package.
WordStar Professional 5.0 / 5.5	MicroPro	Word processing package.
Write 2.1 and Word 4.0	Microsoft Corporation	Entry-level and advanced word processors.

== History ==
During its eight-year life HP NewWave underwent several functional and cosmetic changes, including a revision of the desktop interface and the dropping of the built-in Computer Based Training facility.

=== Apple lawsuit ===
Because of alleged similarities to the Macintosh GUI, NewWave was the subject of an unsuccessful "look and feel" lawsuit by Apple (see Apple v. Microsoft).

== Reception ==
While praising HP's "serious, sincere effort" to give Windows "a complete, object-oriented" GUI, Stewart Alsop II in 1988 doubted that other software developers would create software for NewWave because HP "is not considered a standard setter", IBM and Microsoft had their own desktop-metaphor plans, and existing applications needed "a substantial redesign and rewrite" to effectively use it.

HP NewWave was never adopted as a mainstream end-user environment although it was adopted by a number of corporate clients as the basis for office productivity projects including:

- BT BoaT - Major British Telecom office automation project.
- Royal Insurance - desktop project implemented by the Liverpool-based insurance company.
- N&P - National and Provincial building society - based in Bradford.
- TSB Trust Company - Desktop architecture.

HP had some success in licensing NewWave to other hardware manufacturers:

- Data General repackaged NewWave as CEO Object Office, and introduced it as an extension to their CEO Office office automation software.
- NCR used NewWave as the basis for their Cooperation software.

== Legacy ==
In January 1990 HP stated its intention to provide NewWave capabilities on Unix with Motif and on OS/2 with Presentation Manager. Although these versions were never released HP did contribute some of its NewWave technology to projects run by the Open Software Foundation of which HP was a member.

== Release history ==
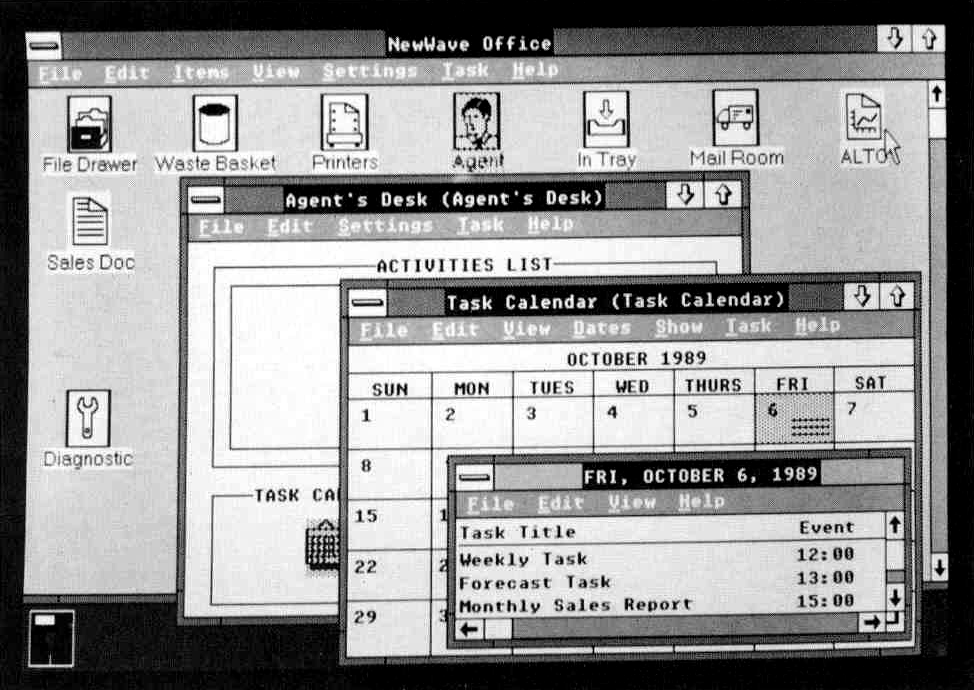
Screenshot from a late-1987 beta version of NewWave

Version	Date	HP Product #	Internal version	Distribution Medium	Notes
	1987			5¼-inch / 3½-inch FD	Alpha / beta pre-releases
	February 1988			5¼-inch / 3½-inch FD	Software developer’s kit (SDK).
1.0	2nd-half 1988	D1704		5¼-inch / 3½-inch FD	First end-user release.
2.0	1989				
3.0	1990	D1704B		5¼-inch / 3½-inch FD	3½-inch floppy disk: option AA8 / 5¼-inch floppy disk: option AA9
4.0	1992				’’HP NewWave 4 Working Model’’ evaluation version.
4.0	1992				
4.1	1992	D1704D	C.02.00		Branded as HP NewWave Office 4.1
4.5	1995		C.03.00		English language version only
4.5 patch	July 1995		C.03.04		US English language version only
