= Joe Guthridge =

American computer scientist

Joe Guthridge is an American computer scientist, best known for his contributions to the development of a family of word processing software that began in the 1980s. Software from that original work is still being used as of 201x.

Guthridge gained recognition for his work in an important standardization area.

== Recognition ==
Guthridge was presented with Microsoft's Windows Pioneer Award in 1994. This was a recognition by Bill Gates of seven non-Microsoft employees who made important contributions to the development of Windows.

== Samna Amí ==
Joe Guthridge led the development of Samna Amí, the first Windows word processor, which was subsequently renamed Lotus Word Pro somewhat after Samna was acquired by Lotus Development.

Among the strengths of Ami Pro, successor to Samna Amí, were scientific writing, including equation editing.

=== Lotus Amí ===
Even after the internal file format of the original .sam evolved to .lwp (Lotus Word-Processing), Microsoft and Wordperfect supported exporting to this product, which was described in a review as having a mail-merge "much faster than Word, somewhat faster than WordPerfect"

== Honorable mention ==
An international study about gridlock during rush hours cited Joe Guthridge's opinion that "evening rush hours are usually worse than their morning equivalent, because at the start of the day people are intent on getting to work, while on the way home they often make one or two traffic-slowing stops."
