= LinDVD =

- Developer(s): InterVideo, Corel
- Initial release: 2002
- Written in: ?
- Operating system: Linux
- Available in: English
- Type: Video player
- License: closed-source
- Website: www.intervideo.com

LinDVD was commercial proprietary software for Linux for the playback of DVDs and other multimedia files. It was first introduced in 2002 by InterVideo, who were later acquired by Corel. The latest version supported ultra-mobile PCs (UMPCs) and mobile internet devices (MIDs), as well as a streaming media and a wider range of standard and high-definition video and audio encoding standards.

LinDVD can play DVDs copy protected with Content Scramble System (CSS). Certain distributions like Mandriva have included this software in their commercial Linux distributions, and Dell preinstalled it on some Ubuntu systems.

== See also ==
- Comparison of media players
- WinDVD
- PowerDVD
- VLC media player
