= Windows Pioneers =

The Windows Pioneers are the seven individuals who received awards from Microsoft in 1994 in recognition of their contributions to Microsoft Windows. Bill Gates presented each pioneer with an award.

The seven Windows Pioneers were:

- Alan Cooper – the "father of Visual Basic"
- Lyle Griffin – created Micrografx Designer, the earliest graphics application for Windows
- Joe Guthridge – led the development of Samna Amí, the first Windows word processor, later renamed Lotus Word Pro
- Ted Johnson – led the development of PageMaker desktop publishing software. Co-founder of Visio Corporation
- Ian Koenig – led the development of the Reuters Terminal financial information software
- Ray Ozzie – created Lotus Notes. Would later (2005–2010) serve as Microsoft's Chief Software Architect
- Charles Petzold – author of Programming Windows series from Microsoft Press, as well as many other programming books for Microsoft
