= DVDStyler =

Free software for DVD authoring

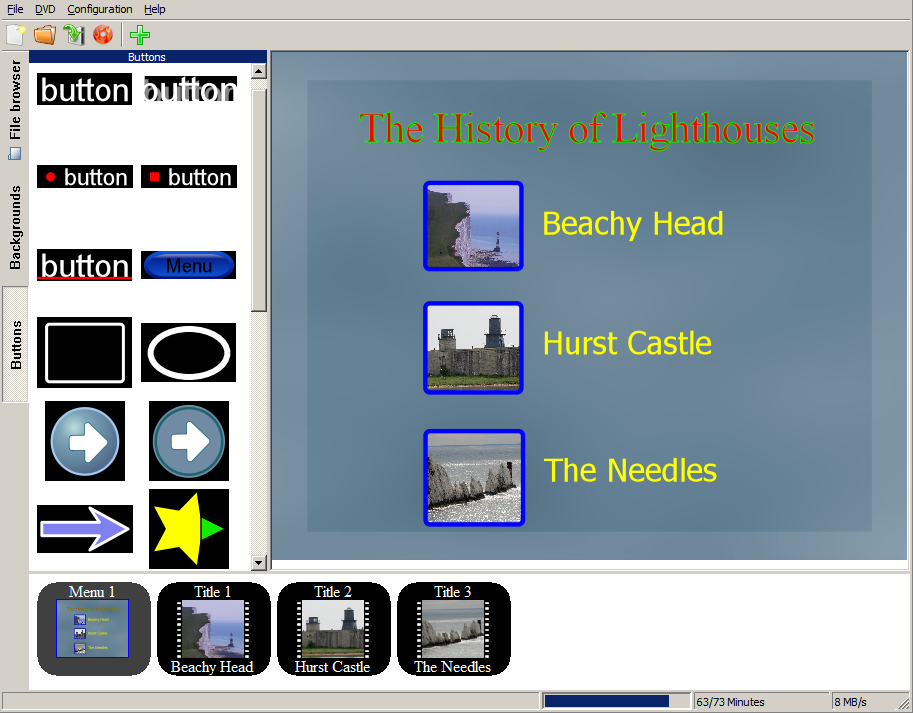
- Developer: Alex Thüring (SourceForge)
- Release: December 6, 2003; 22 years ago
- Stable release: 3.2.1 / 2 November 2021; 4 years ago
- Written in: C++
- Operating system: Linux, Windows, OS X
- Platform: wxWidgets
- Available in: English, German, Italian
- Type: Optical disc authoring
- License: GNU General Public License
- Website: www.dvdstyler.org
- Repository: sourceforge.net/projects/dvdstyler/

DVDStyler is a DVD authoring tool that supports creating video content for both DVDs and CDs, allowing users to burn the output to either DVD or CD media. It allows menu creation, buttons, and DVD previews. It is free and open source software under the GNU GPL.

== Controversy ==
=== Adware criticism ===
Some users have criticized the inclusion of adware in the Windows installer, as well as the obfuscation of the setting to opt out, in versions 2.8.0 and 2.8.1. Newer versions have no reported adware or spyware.

== See also ==
- DVD-Video
- DVD authoring
- DVD Flick
- List of DVD authoring applications
