= Ulead DVD MovieFactory =

Corel DVD MovieFactory
- Original author: Ulead Systems
- Developer: Corel
- Stable release: 7 7.00.398.0 / November 2009
- Operating system: Microsoft Windows
- Type: Video editing software, DVD authoring
- License: Trialware
- Website: www.corel.com/corel/product/index.jsp?pid=prod3430136

Corel DVD MovieFactory is a video editing and DVD authoring software product for Microsoft Windows, initially made by Ulead Systems and subsequently by Corel. It creates and authors multimedia discs in HD DVD, Blu-ray, DVD Video and DVD Audio. It also creates and rips Audio CDs and MP3 CDs. DVD MovieFactory is commonly bundled with many of the modern Toshiba Satellite laptops. Official Japanese version is also known as MovieWriter.

== See also ==
- Ulead Systems
- Corel
