= Thinking Space =

Thinking Space may refer to:

- Thinking Space, an information mapping application, see Mindjet#Company history
- Thinking Space, a book by Mike Crang
