= New Adventures of Queen Victoria =

The New Adventures of Queen Victoria
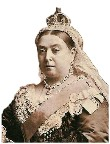
- Queen Victoria as seen in The New Adventures of Queen Victoria
- Author: Pab Sungenis
- Current status/schedule: Daily webcomic
- Launch date: February 8, 2006; 20 years ago
- End date: February 14, 2021
- Syndicate(s): GoComics (2007–2021)
- Publisher(s): Lulu Publishing; Monkeys With Typewriters, LLC
- Genre: Humor

The New Adventures of Queen Victoria was a daily webcomic created by Pab Sungenis. It used the photo-manipulation technique popularized by Adobe Photoshop and other image editing programs to insert actual photographs and paintings of the characters into situations, instead of more conventional methods. It was syndicated online by GoComics, a division of Andrews McMeel Universal, and has been collected into six trade paperback editions.

== Publication history ==
The strip debuted in a discussion on a LiveJournal blog on February 8, 2006. Sungenis, who had been planning on creating a webcomic called In The Land Of Wonderful Clipart (the title was an homage to Winsor McCay's Little Nemo in Slumberland) did the first strip as a one-shot joke commenting on what he perceived as a lack of humor in the comic strip Garfield. Inspired by the humorous potential, Sungenis decided to add the strip to his own blog and keep doing it. Eventually, he moved the strip to its own blog.

On April 5, 2006, the strip joined Comics Sherpa, an online service of Uclick. On April 3, 2007, Uclick announced that Queen Victoria had been picked up for inclusion on its GoComics.com and MyComicsPage.com services, and began running on those services on Monday, May 21, 2007.

As of April 9, 2009, the strip attracted more than 10,000 daily subscribers.

The strip ended on February 14, 2021; according to Sungenis, "15 years is long enough to do anything."

In January 2026 the comic returned to GoComics with new strips.

== Cast ==
Main characters:

- Victoria, Queen of the United Kingdom of Great Britain and Ireland, Empress of India, and thoroughly modern monarch.
- Edward, her son and future king.

Recurring secondary characters:

- Liz, a former queen, and Victoria's best friend.
- Mary, Victoria's friend and spiritual guide.
- Maurice, a clipart image, who serves as Victoria's handyman.
- Mrs. Clipart, another clipart image, who is principal of Edward's school.
- Grandpa, Victoria's grandfather, who is quite mad.
- Anne, Liz's mother.
- Osama, a master of disguise and Victoria's self-appointed nemesis. Extremely incompetent.
- Barfly and Schrodinger, a cat-and-physicist Vaudeville act
- Fumetto dell'Arte, a "spin off" comic strip supposedly done by "Pirandello diPierdiemenico" featuring characters from the Commedia dell'arte like Arlecchino and Flavio

== Style and influences ==
The graphic style of the strip has been compared to the animations of Terry Gilliam as seen on the television show Monty Python's Flying Circus. This same technique was used to a limited degree by Berkeley Breathed in his comic strip Bloom County, to add photographs and images of famous people to the background of the strip.

Like Gilliam's creations, which Sungenis openly acknowledges as an influence, the strip uses cut-out photographs and other images for its characters and settings. Sungenis used the PhotoImpact program by Ulead Systems to create each strip, using a series of stock images he had collected over the years along with some artwork he himself drew when needed. A degree of motion was sometimes portrayed by subtle tilting or shifting of characters within frames, and emotions were sometimes expressed by adding "bug-eyes" to the character photographs.

== Reception ==
Michael Cavna of The Washington Post called the strip one of his favorite webcomics, claiming that he is "surprised more by 'Queen Vic's' wit in a week than I am by a year's worth of 'Garfield.'" Comics Buyer's Guide gave the third paperback collection of the strip three out of four stars, referring to it as a "brilliant webcomic" and saying that "the strips are hilarious."

The strip was chosen as Comics Coast To Coast's "Webcomic Pick Of The Week" on July 14, 2007.

== Collected editions ==
Six paperback collections of the strip have been published:

- We Are Not Amusing ISBN 978-0-557-03054-5, published 2006 by Lulu Publishing.
- I Can Has Empire? ISBN 978-1-4357-0847-1, published 2007 by Lulu.
- Norton Hears A Who, And Other Stories ISBN 978-0-557-03043-9, published 2008 by Lulu.
- Suffragettes Gone Wild, ISBN 978-0-9842157-3-7, published 2009 by 2,000 Monkeys With Typewriters, LLC.
- Meet The Royals, ISBN 978-0-9842157-4-4, published 2010 by 2,000 Monkeys With Typewriters, LLC. (a compendium edition collecting "We Are Not Amusing", "I Can Has Empire?" and "Norton Hears a Who, And Other Stories" with extra never-before seen material)
- Real Housewives of Windsor, The, ISBN 978-0-9842157-5-1, published 2011 by 2,000 Monkeys With Typewriters, LLC.
