= DeVeDe =

- Developer(s): Sergio Costas
- Stable release: 4.21.0 / 8 February 2025; 40 days ago
- Repository: gitlab.com/rastersoft/devedeng
- Written in: Python
- Operating system: Linux
- Available in: Multilingual
- Type: DVD and CD authoring utility
- License: GNU General Public License 3
- Website: www.rastersoft.com/programas/devede.html

DeVeDe is a free and open-source DVD and CD authoring utility. DeVeDe produces disk images ready for authoring to CD or DVD, and allows to burn them to CD/DVD discs. The source material may be in any of a number of audio and video formats, and DeVeDe automatically converts the material to formats compatible with audio CD and video DVD standards, as used by CD and DVD player devices. DeVeDe uses other software packages, including MPlayer, MEncoder/FFmpeg, DVDAuthor, VCDImager and mkisofs, to perform the format conversions, and can use K3b or Brasero to burn an ISO image on Ubuntu, or a variety of other software on Windows.

DeVeDe can handle source material in many popular video file formats, including .avi, .mp4, .mpg, and .mkv.

== Features ==
- It can create video DVD, VCD, SVCD, China Video Disc images, and MPEG-4 ASP (playable on "DivX players") and H264 video files.
- Option for not creating images, but creating only video files.
- PAL and NTSC support.
- Optimization for dual core CPUs.
- Creating menu for video DVDs.
- Adding subtitle.
- Shifting audio.
- Basic video editing operations (rotating, deinterlacing, etc.)
- Supports large variety of formats.

== See also ==
- DVD-Video
- DVD authoring
- List of DVD authoring applications
