= C'est la Vie (comic strip) =

American comic strip by Jennifer Babcock

- Author(s): Jennifer Babcock
- Website: www.gocomics.com/cestlavie
- Current status/schedule: Current daily strip
- Launch date: November 11, 2003; 21 years ago
- Syndicate(s): Uclick/Universal Uclick/Andrews McMeel Syndication
- Publisher(s): Andrews McMeel Publishing
- Genre(s): Humor

C'est la Vie is a comic strip by Jennifer Babcock. Since November 11, 2003, the strip has been syndicated on the web by Uclick/Universal Uclick/Andrews McMeel Syndication.

Before it was picked up for syndication, C'est la Vie premiered in UCLA's Daily Bruin. It was also self-published by the artist on the web.

The primary character of the comic is Mona Montrois, a chain-smoking Parisienne living in Los Angeles. Her sidekick is Monsieur Smokey, a lewd, chauvinistic stuffed bunny.
