= Picture Publisher =

Raster graphics editor

- Picture Publisher Plus (version 2.5) running in Windows 2.1
- Original author: Astral Development
- Developers: Astral Development (1989–1991); Micrografx (1991–2002)
- Initial release: January 1989; 37 years ago
- Final release: 10.0 / 2002; 24 years ago
- Platform: Microsoft Windows; Classic Mac OS
- Type: Raster graphics editor
- License: Proprietary software

Picture Publisher is a raster graphics editor originally developed by Astral Development for Microsoft Windows in 1989. In 1991, Micrografx acquired Astral and took over development of Picture Publisher, giving it a massive overhaul for its third version. It was one of the first graphics editors for Windows and was lauded by technology journalists for its versatility. Among Windows-based graphics editors, it competed with ZSoft's Publisher's Paintbrush and Aldus' PhotoStyler.

== Features ==
=== Astral versions ===
Versions 1.0 through 2.5 were developed by Astral Development Corporation for Windows 2.0. Intended for image editing of scanned originals or digitized still frames of video, it was one of the first advanced image editing programs for Windows.

Any grayscale TIFF file can be opened up in Picture Publisher; alternatively, the software can interface with a number of grayscale scanners or video digitizers. Once an image is loaded, the user can manipulate the image's tone, contrast, and brightness. The user can also perform various retouching tools, including paint, airbrush, rectangular selection, freehand masking, and copying and pasting. The program also contains a number of global filters that affect the entire image. As well, the user may crop, scale, rotate, and mirror their images. Once finished, the user can output their finalized image in a variety of file formats supported by desktop publishing applications, including Aldus's PageMaker and Xerox's Ventura Publisher.

A key feature of Picture Publisher was its ability to bypass a technical limitation of Windows 2.0. While this version of Windows typically supports displaying only a few shades of gray when using a VGA graphics card, Picture Publisher can manipulate as many as 256 levels of gray (8-bit grayscale). It achieves this by bypassing Windows' GDI and writing directly to the video controller card in Mode 13h. A color palette with 64 shades of gray is selected, and a bespoke GUI is presented to the user. This has the disadvantage of reducing the resolution of the display down to 320 by 200 pixels; additionally, it is not capable of displaying images in 8-bit grayscale, only 6-bit grayscale (64 shades of gray). Furthermore, some actions such as changing the size of the paintbrush and applying global filters requires the program to switch back to Windows' GDI, where the grayscale bit depth is severely limited. Nonetheless, Picture Publisher can manipulate and output images in 8-bit grayscale with the full gamut preserved with every action; it was the first Windows application capable of this feat.

In September 1990, Astral released Picture Publisher Plus, a separate package of Picture Publisher that added support for 8-bit and 24-bit color. Astral sold the standard Picture Publisher and Picture Publisher simultaneously, the latter costing $100 more retail. In February 1991, Astral released Picture Publisher Mac for Classic Mac OS (at the time, System 6), supporting both grayscale and color images. Initially touted in late 1989, the release of Picture Publisher Mac was delayed for over a year.

=== Micrografx versions ===
In March 1991, Micrografx acquired Astral Development Corporation for $5 million in a stock swap, strictly for the rights to Picture Publisher. For version 3.0, Micrografx rewrote Picture Publisher nearly from scratch in order to support Windows 3.0—itself an extensive overhaul of Windows 2.0. Unlike previous versions of Picture Publisher, version 3.0 is capable of handling both grayscale and color images (up to 24-bit color depth). Micrografx based the interface for version 3.0 of Picture Publisher on the company's Windows Draw vector graphics editor. According to PC Magazine, Picture Publisher 3.0 was the first graphics editor for Windows with freely adjustable Bezier curves within its path-clipping tool.

== Version history ==
Version	Developer	Release date	Notes
1.0	Astral	January 1989	Initial release
2.0	Astral	October 1989	
2.1	Astral	December 1990	
Mac	Astral	January 1991	Mac-only version
Plus 2.5	Astral	September 1990	First version to support color
2.5	Astral	January 1991	
3.0	Micrografx	February 1992	
3.1	Micrografx	June 1992	
4.0	Micrografx	June 1993	
5.0	Micrografx	September 1994	
6.0	Micrografx	1996	
7.0	Micrografx	1997	
8.0	Micrografx	1998	
9.0	Micrografx	2001	
10.0	Micrografx	2002	Final version; split into two SKUs: Professional (for advanced users) and Digital Camera Edition (for novice users)

Micrografx also published lightweight versions of Picture Publisher under the name Picture Publisher LE across various version, usually bundled with scanners.
