= Sungenis =

Sungenis is a family name of Italian origin, originally spelled San Genisi, in reference to Saint Genesius of Rome. By coincidence, it is also a transliteration of the Greek word for a blood relative, συγγενής, cf. Luke 1:36, which has συγγενίς.

- Robert Sungenis, Catholic apologist and author.
- Pab Sungenis, creator of the webcomic The New Adventures of Queen Victoria.
