= Breaking Cat News =

American comic strip by Georgia Dunn

- Author: Georgia Dunn
- Website: http://www.breakingcatnews.com and https://www.gocomics.com/breaking-cat-news
- Current status/schedule: Daily strip, including Sundays
- Launch date: March 12, 2014
- Syndicate: Universal Uclick/Andrews McMeel Syndication
- Publisher: Andrews McMeel Publishing
- Genre(s): Humor, Cats

Breaking Cat News is a comic strip created by cartoonist Georgia Dunn and distributed to newspapers and the GoComics website through Andrews McMeel Syndication.

== Publication history ==
Dunn created the strip after relocating to her native Westerly, Rhode Island, after living in Seattle from 2010 to early 2014. She returned to the Seattle area in 2017.

The strip made its debut on March 12, 2014, initially self-syndicated by Dunn. It has been available on the GoComics website since October 20, 2014.

Andrews McMeel Publishing released the first collection of the strips in 2016. In the foreword, Dunn shared that she got the idea for the strip when one of her cats created a mess, prompting the others to investigate. This incident inspired her to envision them as television news channel reporters and to develop distinct voices for them.

== Story ==
The main characters in Breaking Cat News are based on Dunn's own cats Elvis, Lupin, and Puck, augmented by newer arrivals Goldie, Iggy, and Ora Zella. They are drawn in watercolor and ink. The characters' personalities are based on the personalities and behavior of their real-life counterparts. Also in the cast are a human family originally referred to as the Woman, the Man, the Toddler, and the Baby. In a January 5, 2020, broadcast, when the Baby becomes a toddler, they change the reference terms to The Boy and The Girl. Other people, cats, and other domestic and wild creatures appear.

Because this strip is "news important to cats", a typical lead story might be "There's a great big box in the living room!" or "Someone ate all the flowers and threw up in the hallway." Only the animals have names. There are larger story arcs, such as Tommy the stray finding his Woman, the Children developing, the weather, the reunion of ghost cat Tillie with her human, holiday traditions, the People buying a house, et cetera.

== Characters ==
The original three cats (all adult males), living on the second floor of the Big Pink House with the Man, the Woman, the Boy, and the Girl:

- Lupin -- the lead anchor of the CN (Cat Network) News desk, despite being the youngest of the original three cats and being deaf due to an illness when very young (he reads whiskers and understands signs). He has white fur and an irrepressible spirit for having fun and adventure.
- Elvis -- the eldest of the original three cats. He's a cynical, jaded reporter with a heart of gold, although he is a Siamese who is easily stressed and doesn't handle change well.
- Puck -- a sensitive, sweet guy who can be courageous when he needs to be. Puck is a black cat missing his right hind foot (he was attacked as a kitten by a bird of prey), and is expert at making charts for the newscasts.

Additions to the original three cats:

- Goldie -- a largish ginger adult female adopted by the family after being abandoned when her previous family moved. She has a notch in one ear, probably due to an injury prior to her adoption.

Two half-grown kittens who had bonded while at an animal shelter. After they escaped from there, they were adopted by the family:
- Iggy -- full name is Igula; a placid black-and-white boy who likes lining up his toys.
- Ora Zella -- a tortie (tortoiseshell) girl, fearless and rambunctious.

Non-cat additions to the household:

- Miss Elizabeth (sometimes called "Miss E.") -- a gray rabbit that is a "foster fail." When the Quinn Animal Shelter had to close temporarily, Miss E. moved in.

Additional cats who live nearby (alphabetical):

- Baba Mouse -- a 26-year-old Russian Blue female cat who lives in an outbuilding of nearby Quinn Farms (the same farm as Burt). She is wise and crotchety, but has a good, tender heart. She was one of the last kittens fostered by Winifred Quinn, the previous owner of the Big Pink House, the farm, and barn.
- Beatrix -- a female polydactyl kitten who, after interning at the BN News station, has moved to the bookstore as its cat assistant.
- Burt -- the technical audio/visual expert of the CN News reporting crew. He sometimes adds informative news feeds at the bottom of the broadcasts that are occasionally snarky. He lives in the barn of nearby Quinn Farms (the same farm as Baba Mouse, of whom he is a great-great-great-grandson). He is an easy-going ginger adult male with a lot of patience.
- Sir Figaro Newton -- an inquisitive Spanish-speaking tuxie (tuxedo) adult male cat who lives with Tabitha on the third floor of the Big Pink House with their Woman. He and Tabitha are the reporters for the Spanish-language Gatos de Noticias (News Cats) broadcast.
- Sophie -- a quiet, artistic long-haired adult female tabby cat with an "M" on her forehead. She has two different colored eyes and is blind in her left one. She loves to read and creates art works in "mixed media modernism," using found materials. She lives with Tommy and their Woman, now on the first floor of the Big Pink House. At first, she found Tommy to be a little boisterous for her, but has grown to tolerate and even like him.
- Tabitha -- an alpha adult female cat who speaks four languages (Spanish, English, and two others). She is famous for having caught the red dot of a laser cat toy. She lives with Sir Figaro Newton on the third floor of the Big Pink House with their Woman. She and Sir Figaro Newton are the reporters for the Spanish-language Gatos de Noticias (News Cats) broadcast.
- Tommy -- adult male found by Elvis in a story arc when they were both temporarily lost from their homes. Tommy's home was nearby with Sophie and their Woman, but they recently moved to the first floor of the Big Pink House. Tommy is a large fluffy happy-go-lucky cat.
- Ghost cats (all were cats owned at one time or another by Winifred Quinn, the previous owner of the Big Pink House, the farm, and barn and who later founded the Quinn Animal Shelter):

- Admiral Whiskers -- a reporter anchoring the RCO (Radio Cat Oracle) spirit broadcast desk. He, Carl, and Lady Jane were a group of three contemporaneous cats who predeceased Ms. Quinn.
- Angus -- a reporter for the RCO (Radio Cat Oracle) spirit broadcast desk. He was the last cat owned by Ms. Quinn. After Ms. Quinn's death, he was adopted by Dr. Man, the local veterinarian and current head of the Quinn Animal Shelter.
- Carl -- the newsphotographer for the RCO (Radio Cat Oracle) spirit broadcast desk. He, Admiral Whiskers, and Lady Jane were a group of three contemporaneous cats who predeceased Ms. Quinn.
- Lady Jane -- a reporter for the RCO (Radio Cat Oracle) spirit broadcast desk. She, Admiral Whiskers, and Carl were a group of three contemporaneous cats who predeceased Ms. Quinn. She was adopted by Ms. Quinn after her previous owner, the local mayor, died.
- Tillie -- She was a cat owned by a young Winifred Quinn. Tillie unfortunately died when she was trapped in the house.
(Radio Cat Oracle [RCO] is the spirit broadcasting service broadcasting from the attic of the Big Pink House.)

Non-cats living in or near the Big Pink House:

- Agnes -- one of the four "Robber Mice." Agnes is a mouse reporter for BN News. She and Alice are sisters.
- Alice -- leader of the four "Robber Mice." She and Agnes are sisters.
- Natasha -- one of the four "Robber Mice" and the bravest of the four. She escaped from Grimtech Labs along with her friend, Violet.
- Violet -- one of the four "Robber Mice" and the explosions expert (her favorite is a sandwich bag filled with flour or glitter and tossed from a distance). She escaped from Grimtech Labs along with her friend, Natasha.
- Trevor -- a large, lovable shaggy black-and-white Border Collie who also lives at the bookstore with Beatrix.

Additional animal characters appear occasionally, including Agatha, the Golden Mouse, and various domestic and woodland characters, including weasels, raccoons, opossums, moles, several types of birds, etc.

A recurring arc is the BCN soap opera "Our IX Lives" with the following characters (note that "Taggart" was spelled "Taggert" in the December 2024 series):

- Angora Taggart -- daughter of Snowbelle Taggart. She is presumed to be the younger since her mother refers to her "baby Angora." She loves Kit Chase. As of December 2024, she has a "bustlin'" fashion business in a city. However, on a return visit to her hometown, Viejo Gato, she discovered that Snowball's money wasn't really his—it was her mother's and her mother willed it to Princess. Princess then sold all the assets to Angora. Thus, Angora was now the richest cat in Viejo Gato. She decides to return permanently to Viejo Gato.
- Bandit -- brother of Kit Chase. He was a magician and is currently a police officer. He is attracted to Paisley (the interest is returned) and may be the father of her three telekinetic kittens (it is suspected, but remains uncertain), including Bandit, Jr. At one point, Dr. Mittens had locked Bandit and Paisley in a haunted abandoned asylum, and Bandit got them both out using his magician skills.
- Bandit, Jr.—son of Bandit (Paisley is his mother). He is one of the telekinetic kittens and is a natural investigator—he correctly uncovers Snowball Taggart as the actual catnip smuggler, thereby allowing Kit out of jail.
- Captain Jack B. Nimble—husband of Princess Taggart and twin brother of Paisley (they were separated at birth). A sea captain, he is frequently lost at sea. Their kittens are Sweetheart (girl) and Rascal, Rogue, and Rowdy (boys).
- Dr. Mittens -- treacherous co-conspirator of Snowball Taggart and not to be trusted by anybody. At one point, he and That Guy Brad tried to fake Snowball Taggart's death in an effort to force Angora to marry That Guy Brad, but were foiled by Kit Chase. At another point, he locked Bandit and Paisley in a haunted abandoned asylum, and Bandit got them both out using his magician skills. He, Snowball Taggart, and That Guy Brad smuggle catnip.
- Father O'Kittery -- the priest at Church of Our Cat's Sake. He runs the orphanage that "Sister" Snowbelle is at. She calls him "Lucky." Father O'Kittery and Snowbelle were once in love, but Snowball Taggart kidnapped Snowbelle's father and faked the father's death to force Snowbelle to marry him. O'Kittery then became a priest. Shortly after marrying Snowball Taggart, Snowbelle realized she was pregnant; thus, one of her kittens (probably Princess) is presumed to be fathered by O'Kittery.
- Kit Chase -- a Japanese bobtail cat. He is Angora Taggart’s love interest and a brother of Bandit. He was raised in Father O'Kittery's orphanage, but gets in trouble with the law. At one point, he kidnapped Snowball Taggart in order to foil a plot by Dr. Mittens and That Guy Brad to fake Snowball Taggart's death and force Angora to marry That Guy Brad. At another point, he is framed by Snowball Taggart for smuggling catnip and put in jail by his brother, Bandit.
- Paisley -- twin sister of Captain Nimble (they were separated at birth) and friend of Angora. She became psychic when she was struck by lightning at a haunted observatory. Bandit is attracted to her (she returns the interest) and he may be the father of her three telekinetic kittens (it is suspected, but remains uncertain), including Bandit, Jr. At one point, Dr. Mittens had locked Bandit and Paisley in a haunted abandoned asylum, and Bandit got them both out using his magician skills.
- Princess Taggart -- daughter of Snowbelle Taggart. She is married to Captain Nimble, who is frequently lost at sea. Their kittens are Sweetheart (girl) and Rascal, Rogue, and Rowdy (boys). She is presumed to be the eldest (since her mother refers to Angora as "baby Angora") and a daughter of Father O'Kittery. In December 2024, it was revealed that Snowball's money wasn't really his—it was Snowbelle's and Snowbelle willed it to Princess. Princess then sold all the assets to Angora.
- "Sister" Snowbelle -- wife of Snowball Taggart and mother of Angora and Princess Taggart. She is presumed dead in a helicopter crash, but is actually living under the assumed name of "Sister Snowbelle" at Father O'Kittery's orphanage. She and Father O'Kittery were once in love—Snowball Taggart kidnapped her father and faked the father's death to force Snowbelle to marry him. O'Kittery then became a priest. Shortly after marrying Snowball Taggart, she realized she was pregnant; thus, one of her kittens (probably Princess, since Father O'Kittery refers to her as "our daughter" and Snowbelle refers to Angora as "baby Angora") is presumed to be fathered by O'Kittery.
- Snowball Taggart -- formerly the richest cat in Viejo Gato (California). He is an avaricious and manipulative tycoon. His (official) daughters are Angora and Princess; however, one of them may not be (probably Princess). Angora and Princess’ mother is presumed dead in a helicopter crash, but is actually living as "Sister" Snowbelle at the orphanage run by Father O’Kittery. Taggart faked Snowbelle's father's death to coerce her to marry him. At another point, he tried to frame Kit Chase for smuggling catnip, but was exposed by Bandit, Jr. He, Dr. Mittens, and That Guy Brad are the catnip smugglers. In December 2024, it was revealed that Snowball's money wasn't really his—it was Snowbelle's and Snowbelle willed it to Princess. Princess then sold all the assets to Angora. Thus, Angora is now the richest cat in Viejo Gato.
- That Guy Brad -- Snowball Taggart’s business partner. He schemes to marry Angora Taggart for her money, supported by her father. At one point, he and Dr. Mittens tried to fake Snowball Taggart's death in an effort to force Angora to marry That Guy Brad, but were foiled by Kit Chase. He, Snowball Taggart, and Dr. Mittens smuggle catnip.

== Bibliography ==
Title	Publication Date	Dates Covered	ISBN
Breaking Cat News: Cats Reporting on the News that Matters to Cats	May 5, 2016	March 12, 2014 - September 25, 2014 (Original Broadcast on BreakingCatNews.com) October 20, 2014 - April 20, 2015 (Rebroadcast on GoComics.com)	ISBN 978-1449474133
Lupin Leaps In: A Breaking Cat News Adventure	March 5, 2019	September 29, 2014 - August 31, 2015 (Original Broadcast on BreakingCatNews.com) April 23, 2015 - February 8, 2016 (Rebroadcast on GoComics.com)	ISBN 978-1449495220
Take It Away, Tommy!: A Breaking Cat News Adventure	March 31, 2020	September 3, 2015 - February 15, 2016 (Original Broadcast on BreakingCatNews.com) February 11, 2016 - May 1, 2016 (Rebroadcast on GoComics.com)	ISBN 978-1524858186
Elvis Puffs Out: A Breaking Cat News Adventure	October 6, 2020	February 18, 2016 - July 28, 2016 (Original Broadcast on BreakingCatNews.com) May 3, 2016 - July 28, 2016 (Rebroadcast on GoComics.com)	ISBN 978-1524858193
Behind the Scenes with Burt: A Breaking Cat News Adventure	April 5, 2022	December 14, 2016 - November 26, 2017	ISBN 978-1524871277
Pucky, Prince of Bacon: A Breaking Cat News Adventure	September 6, 2022	December 26, 2017 - September 2, 2018	ISBN 978-1524871284
Everything's Coming Up Beatrix!: A Breaking Cat News Adventure	September 5, 2023	September 20, 2018 - June 21, 2019	ISBN 978-1524879747
Good as Goldie: A Breaking Cat News Adventure	September 17, 2024	June 27, 2019 - January 18, 2020	ISBN 978-1524892067
It's Showtime, Sophie: A Breaking Cat News Adventure	October 28, 2025		ISBN 979-8881602727
