= InterVideo =

Multimedia software company, 1998–2006

- Type: Subsidiary
- Traded as: Nasdaq: IVII
- Industry: Software publishing
- Founded: 1998; 28 years ago
- Founder: Chinn Chin; Honda Shing; Rosemary Leng; Joe Monastiero
- Defunct: 2006
- Fate: Acquired by Corel
- Headquarters: Fremont, California
- Products: Video software, multimedia software
- Number of employees: 803
- Parent: Corel Corporation
- Website: www.intervideo.com

InterVideo was a software publisher specialising in multimedia-related programs, headquartered in Fremont, California. The company's products covered video capturing, video editing, DVD authoring, CD/DVD recording and video playback. Its best-known product was WinDVD, a widely used DVD player application sold both at retail and bundled with OEM hardware.

InterVideo also operated a HandHeld Business Unit focused on multimedia software for mobile and embedded devices, including smartphones, GPS units and portable entertainment players. This unit's technology was embedded in devices by a range of hardware partners before the broader company was absorbed into Corel.

== History ==
InterVideo was founded in 1998 in Fremont, California. The company went public on the Nasdaq under the ticker IVII.

On 13 August 2005, InterVideo acquired Ulead Systems for approximately $68 million, and announced a formal merger with Ulead on 9 July 2006.

On 28 August 2006, Corel Corporation announced that it would acquire InterVideo for approximately $196 million.

== Closure ==
On 12 December 2006, Corel announced the acquisition of InterVideo and Ulead had been completed. The InterVideo brand name was retired, with all former InterVideo products subsequently marketed under the Corel or Ulead names.

== See also ==
- WinDVD
- Corel Corporation
- Ulead Systems
