= Uclick =

Former digital entertainment site

- Formerly: Universal New Media (1996–1997)
- Type: Web syndication
- Founded: 1996; 30 years ago
- Founder: Andrews McMeel Universal
- Defunct: September 2009; 17 years ago
- Fate: Merged with Universal Press Syndicate to form Universal Uclick
- Successor: Andrews McMeel Syndication
- Headquarters: Kansas City, Missouri, United States
- Services: Sold "digital entertainment content" for personal computers, the World Wide Web, mobile phones
- Parent: Andrews McMeel Universal
- Subsidiaries: GoComics; ThePuzzleSociety.com; UclickGames.com
- Website: www.uclick.com

Uclick
- Website type: Comics
- Owner: Universal Uclick
- Website: http://www.uclick.com
- Commercial: Yes
- Registration: Optional

Uclick LLC was an American corporation (a division of Andrews McMeel Universal) selling "digital entertainment content" for the desktop, the web and mobile phones. Uclick operated several consumer websites, including the comic strip and editorial cartoon site GoComics and the puzzle and casual game sites ThePuzzleSociety.com and UclickGames.com.

Uclick content included comic strips, editorial cartoons, puzzles, casual games, manga, comic books, syndicated columns, photography and illustration. Uclick content was distributed online through consumer and news web portals such as Yahoo!, MSNBC.com, New York Times, washingtonpost.com, CNN, USA TODAY, and AOL. Comic strip and cartoon content from Uclick was available online and on mobile phones through the company's website, Uclick.com.

In July 2009, Uclick merged with Andrews McMeel's Universal Press Syndicate (UPS) to form Universal Uclick (now known as Andrews McMeel Syndication).

== History ==
Universal New Media was formed in 1996 by Andrews McMeel Universal; it was renamed Uclick a year later.

Beginning in January 2009, Andrews McMeel Universal suffered a series of layoffs due to department consolidation and corporate restructuring. These layoffs led to Uclick's July 2009 merger with UPS to form Universal Uclick.

== Comic strips and panels ==
As the digital entertainment division of Andrews McMeel Universal, Uclick was the official online distributor of all comic strips syndicated by Andrews McMeel Universal's newspaper syndication division, Universal Press Syndicate. Uclick also owned and operated GoComics, a comics aggregate website featuring not only comic strips currently syndicated by Universal Press Syndicate, but also webcomics, discontinued titles such as Calvin and Hobbes, The Boondocks, and Bloom County, original works like The New Adventures of Queen Victoria and Bleeker: The Rechargeable Dog, and a selection of syndicated comic strips from Creators Syndicate and Tribune Media Services.

In October 2008, Uclick launched a GoComics gadget for iGoogle which allowed users to read comic strips on their iGoogle pages.

== Puzzles and games ==
Uclick distributed daily puzzles and crazy games through consumer and news web portals as well as through its own puzzle and game portals, The Puzzle Society and UclickGames. Uclick products included crosswords and other word games, number placement puzzles like Sudoku and Kakuro, jigsaw puzzles and other casual games.

== Syndicated columns and text features ==
Uclick-syndicated columns and text features were distributed online through consumer and news web portals as well as through Uclick's syndicated column and text feature consumer site, uExpress.com.

== Comic books and manga ==
In 2006, Uclick launched the United States’ first comic book reader application for mobile phones. The introductory line of titles included Teenage Mutant Ninja Turtles, The Five Fists of Science, Gødland, PvP, and Too Much Coffee Man. In July 2006, Uclick announced the launch of a mobile phone version of Guilstein, a manga and anime title that had never been published in any form in the U.S. In July 2007, Uclick launched Thunder Road, the first comic book produced solely for mobile phone distribution in the U.S. Uclick later added titles from Devil's Due Publishing, Image Comics, IDW Publishing, and independently published books such as Jeff Smith's Bone.
