= Bibble (software) =

Digital imaging program

- Developer(s): Bibble Labs
- Final release: 5.2.3 / December 23, 2011; 13 years ago
- Operating system: Windows, Mac OS X, Linux
- Type: Photo Post-Production
- License: Proprietary
- Website: www.bibblelabs.com

Bibble is a digital imaging program for multiple platforms by Bibble Labs, designed to assist photographers in post-production work and efficient optimization of images created in raw image formats. After Bibble was acquired by Corel, it was rebranded as Corel AfterShot Pro.

== Bibble 5 ==
Bibble 5 is an upgrade to Bibble 4 with the intent of cleaning up and rewriting some of the codebase, updating the GUI, and adding features to the platform.

Bibble 5.0 was released December 29, 2009 and the development was announced on September 22, 2006, and a preview version was released January 31. 2009.

The software exists in a Pro and a Lite package.

=== Added features in version 5 ===
- Image editing tools include selective editing and layers
- Asset management tools
- Metadata tools
- Faster processing and better support of multi-processor systems

=== Third-party plugins for Bibble 5 ===
- Harry – Black & White Converter Using a Color Equalizer
- Sally – Color Enhancer Tool Using a Color Equalizer
- iNDA – Simple Black/White Film Simulator
- Lay – Layer transparency editor
- SplitToni – Split toning for highlights and shadows
- Sean Puckett Plugins – Coming soon, most of the best Sean Puckett Bibble 4 plugins for Bibble 5
- Ghost Writer – Text or logo overlays
- Grid – Overlay a grid pattern over an image

=== Added features in version 5.1 ===
Bibble 5.0 shipped with some functionality missing which Bibble 4 supported, but Bibble 5.1 adds the following features (and more). Additionally, a lite version is available.

- Heal & Clone brush
- Perfectly Clear
- Web Gallery output
- Auto-Contrast feature
- Ability to install third-party plugins
- Additional support and features to Bibble's plugin SDK
- Added support for additional cameras
- Added lens calibration parameters for various lenses.
- Numerous issues resolved.

=== Built-in plugins for Bibble 5.1 ===
- Black And White – Black & White with Spot Color

== Bibble 4 ==
Bibble 4 was supported from October 2004 with their initial release of Bibble 4.0 up until May 2008 when the last version, 4.10, was released. After which no more bug fixes or cameras were added to it and the project was basically closed while Bibble 5 development was ongoing. Bibble 4 is considered deprecated at this point and is no longer supported or sold.

=== Features from version 4 ===
- RAW conversion.
- Post-processing of RAW and JPEG images; e.g. white balance setting, exposure, contrast, fill-light, etc.
- Plug-in architecture.
- Color management, courtesy of ColorFlow.
- Noise reduction, courtesy of Picturecode Noise Ninja.
- Shadow and highlight enhancement, courtesy of Athentech Perfectly Clear.

== See also ==
- Adobe Bridge
- Adobe Photoshop Lightroom
- Apple Aperture
- Corel AfterShot Pro (Bibble successor)
- Darktable
- LightZone
- RawTherapee
