= Microtek =

Taiwan electronics company

Microtek International Inc. 全友電腦股份有限公司

- Headquarters in Hsinchu, Taiwan
- Native name: 全友電腦股份有限公司
- Type: Public
- Traded as: TWSE: 2305
- Industry: Computer hardware Electronics
- Predecessor: Multitech International
- Founded: October 23, 1980; 46 years ago
- Founder: Bobo Wang
- Headquarters: Hsinchu Science and Industrial Park, Hsinchu, Taiwan
- Area served: Worldwide
- Key people: Luke Liu (Spokesman); Benny Hsu (Chairman)
- Products: Scanners, digital imaging, medical imaging, LCDs
- Revenue: NT$715 million (2016)
- Operating income: (NT$116 million) operating loss (2016)
- Net income: NT$33 million (2016)
- Total assets: NT$2.8 billion (2016)
- Total equity: NT$1.7 billion (2016)
- Number of employees: 500

Microtek International Inc. (Chinese: 全友電腦股份有限公司; pinyin: Quányou Diànnǎo Gǔfèn Yǒuxiàn Gōngsī) is a Taiwan-based multinational manufacturer of digital imaging products and other consumer electronics. It produces imaging equipment for medical, biological and industrial fields. It occupies 20 percent of the global imaging market and holds 450 patents worldwide.

It is known for its scanner brands ScanMaker and ArtixScan. The company launched the world's first halftone optical film scanner in 1984, the world's first desktop halftone scanner in 1986, and the world's first color scanner in 1989. It has subsidiaries in Shanghai, Tokyo, Singapore and Rotterdam. It expanded its product lines into the manufacturing of LCD monitors, LCD projectors and digital cameras.

== History ==
=== 1980-1985: Founding and incorporation ===
In 1979, the Taiwanese government launched the Hsinchu Science and Industrial Park (HSIP) as a vision of Shu Shien-Siu to emulate Silicon Valley and to lure back overseas Taiwanese with their experience and knowledge in engineering and technology fields. Initially there were 14 companies, the first was Wang Computer (王氏電腦), by 2010 only six of the original pioneers remained: United Microelectronics Corporation (聯電), Microtek International, Inc. (全友), Quartz Frequency Technology (頻率), Tecom (東訊), Sino-American Silicon Products Inc. (中美矽晶) and Flow Asia Corporation (福祿遠東).

Microtek (Microelectronics Technology) was co-founded in HSIP in 1980 by five Californian Taiwanese, three were colleagues who had worked at Xerox Bobo Wang (王渤渤), Robert Hsieh (謝志鴻), Carter Tseng (曾憲章) and two were colleagues from the University of Southern California, Benny Hsu (許正勳) and Hu Chung-hsing (胡忠信). They decided to set up root after Hsu was invited by HSIP Manager Dr. Irving Ho (何宜慈). In September 1983, the Allied Association for Science Parks Industries (台灣科學園區同業公會 abbr. 竹科) was established and Hsu was elected to be its first chairman.

Microtek first entered the industry in 1983, when scanners were little more than expensive tools for hobbyists. In 1984, it introduced the MS-300A, a desktop halftone scanner. At about the same time, the company realized a need for scanning software for mainstream users and developed EyeStar, the world's first scanning software application. EyeStar made desktop scanning a functional reality, serving as the de facto standard for image format for importing graphics before TIFF came to fruition. Microtek proceeded to develop an OCR, or Optical Character Recognition, program for text scanning, once more successfully integrating a core function of scanning with its machines.

=== 1985: Microtek Lab, Inc. ===
In 1985, Microtek set up its United States subsidiary, Microtek Lab, Inc., in Cerritos, California. The company went public in 1988. It was one of Taiwan's initial technology initial public offerings. Microtek has research and development labs located in California and Taiwan dedicated to optics design, mechanical and electronic engineering, software development, product quality, and technological advancement. According to AnnaLee Saxenian's 2006 book The New Argonauts: Regional Advantage in a Global Economy, Microtek has produced more than 20% of the worldwide image scanner market.

=== 1989: Ulead Systems ===
In 1989, Microtek invested in Ulead Systems (based in Taipei) which became the first publicly traded software company in Taiwan in 1999. Ulead System was founded by Lotus Chen, Lewis Liaw and Way-Zen Chen three colleagues from Taiwan's Institute for Information Industry. Microtek helped Ulead by jointly purchasing CCD sensors from Kodak which benefited both companies as it was a component not yet locally produced at the time.

== Products ==
=== Herbarium Specimen Digitization ===
- ObjectScan 1600 is an on-top scanner designed for capturing high resolution image of herbarium specimen. The device is bundled with ScanWizard Graphy which provides scanner setting and image correction tools. The maximum resolution is 1600 dpi.
- ScanWizard Botany is a workstation software for specimen image processing, electronic data capture software, and uploading metadata to database or server. The software has OCR (Optical Character Recognition) function which can automatically detect label information and read barcode information on botanical collections. The information will be saved as metadata. It also includes image processing tools such as brightness adjustment and contrast adjustment.
- MiVAPP Botany is a botanical database management system and web-server system. This system allows a botanical garden, university, and museum to share their collection online.

== Operations ==
=== Taiwan ===
- Microtek International Inc.: Headquarters, Science-Based Industrial Park, Hsinchu City
- Taipei Office: Da-an District, Taipei City

=== Mainland China ===
- Shanghai Microtek Technology Co., Ltd: Shanghai
- Shanghai Microtek Medical Device Co., Ltd: Shanghai
- Shanghai Microtek Trading Co., Ltd: Shanghai
- Microtek Computer Technology (Wu Jiang) Co., Ltd: Jiangsu

== See also ==
- Ulead Systems
- List of companies in Taiwan
