= Spot the Frog =

American comic strip by Mark Heath

- Author: Mark Heath
- Website: www.gocomics.com/spot-the-frog/
- Current status/schedule: concluded strip; in reruns
- Launch date: January 5, 2004
- End date: July 5, 2008
- Syndicate(s): United Feature Syndicate
- Genre: humor

Spot the Frog was a nationally syndicated newspaper comic strip written by Mark Heath. It tells the story of a talking frog named Spot that moves in with a man named Karl as a tenant in his aquarium, leaving the pond behind him.

The comic strip was launched on January 5, 2004. The original run of the strip ended on July 5, 2008. Syndication host site GoComics continues to run "classic" strips.

== Plot summary ==
Spot is a talking frog that wishes to move away from his home pond and seek broader horizons. He moves in with a middle-aged man named Karl, seeking to "rent" his aquarium for 10 cents a month.

The series follows his adventures outside of his pond, both with Karl as well as his friends, most notably Buddy.

There are several running jokes in the series, often as a result of Spot's superstitions about the world around him. Spot believes that a winter hat shouldn't be worn until it's actually winter, because one shouldn't be "rude to a season." He also believes that anything with a face is automatically sentient and can speak (and, for the purposes of the comic, they often do).

Spot's friend Buddy has his own superstitions, such as the belief that his winter hat flies north for the summer (in actuality, it's simply being carried away by the wind) and returns for the winter.

For the most part Karl simply goes along with Spot's innocent beliefs, never quite buying into them, yet never really questioning them.

== Characters ==
=== Spot ===
The title character of the comic. Spot is distinguished from most of his friends by his two differently-sized eyes. He has innocent superstitions about inanimate objects, usually giving them an artificial personality.

He lives in Karl's aquarium, not as a "pet," but as a tenant who pays 10 cents a month for rent. To find his rent money, he usually looks under couch cushions or gathers change that drops out of people's pockets.

Although he lives indoors with Karl, he still spends a great deal of his time at his old pond with his friends, and this is where much of the comic takes place.

=== Buddy ===
Buddy is Spot's best friend, a self-proclaimed "frog of the wild." He claims to be a natural frog, uncomfortable with human trappings, even though he wears glasses (and a hat during the winter) and watches television through Karl's window.

Most of what Buddy says is complete bravado, though Spot and Karl usually try to indulge him. Buddy lives in Karl's mailbox, using a soda can as a fireplace during the winter months.

=== Karl ===
Karl is a middle-aged man that looks after Spot and lets him stay in his aquarium. Karl usually acts as the straight man for Spot's and Buddy's antics, knowing the flaws in the frogs' thoughts, but willing to play along with them anyway. Even on the rare occasion when he does question one of their ideas, he does so with a smirk and a raised eyebrow, more interested in their response than anything else.

Karl also goes out of his way to protect Spot and his friends, though he rarely lets them know about it. When Spot can't find money for rent, Karl always finds a way to put some loose change in Spot's path without him noticing. He also protects them from more harsh dangers as well, though for the context of the comic's light tone, these instances are incredibly rare.

=== Lumpy ===
Lumpy is the only toad shown in Spot the Frog. He often acts as both a straight man as well as a comic foil to Spot and Buddy.

Lumpy believes that he has to act bitter to protect himself from predators. He claims that because he's so bitter, anyone that tries to eat him will immediately gag on the taste and spit him out. He secretly wishes to be cheerful and upbeat, but is usually unable to incorporate such things into his personality. He often antagonizes Spot and Buddy for sitting on his toadstools, claiming that only toads can sit on toadstools.

=== Bull ===
Bull is a pond frog with a large mouth, known for speaking in very loud tones (often for comic effect). As such, his name is actually short for "bullhorn" and not "bullfrog," as originally guessed by Karl.

Bull hibernates during the winter, so he doesn't usually appear in the comic strip during the winter months.

=== Meg ===
Meg is Bull's girlfriend. She's named after a megaphone, but that moniker is mostly ironic, as she's the complete opposite of bull, being very quiet and roughly half the size of the other frogs at the pond.

Like Bull, Meg doesn't often appear during the winter months because she is hibernating in the pond.

=== Kay ===
Kay is Karl's daughter. She has a mild phobia of frogs due to a mishap she had had while trying to dissect one back when she was in high school. She tries to tactfully explain this to Spot, but Spot misunderstands, believing that her experience was an unrequited love affair. This is due mostly to her claim that the frog "Wouldn't open up."

Spot spends a great deal of his time with Kay trying to relieve her of her phobia, often with less than ideal results. Kay has occasionally taken to at least some level of acceptance of Spot and his friends, but still tends to be uncomfortable around them most of the time.

Kay is generally only a recurring character, appearing in the comic mostly around Thanksgiving.

== Books ==
Spot the Frog has also been published in two different collections by Andrews McMeel Publishing.

Title	Release date	ISBN
Spot the Frog	April 1, 2006	ISBN 978-0-7407-5685-6
It's Hard to Comb a Grass Toupee	June 1, 2007	ISBN 978-0-7407-6353-3
