= CorelCAD =

2D Computer-aided design software

- Developer: Alludo
- Release: May 2011; 15 years ago
- Stable release: 2023 / 19 December 2022; 3 years ago
- Written in: C++, C#
- Engine: ARES
- Operating system: Windows, macOS
- Type: Computer-aided design
- License: Proprietary
- Website: www.coreldraw.com/en/product/corel-cad/

CorelCAD is a computer-aided design (CAD) application for 2D and 3D design. It works on macOS and Windows operating systems. There is also a mobile app of CorelCAD for Android and iOS devices, but it needs a license in order to be accessible.

CorelCAD is no longer sold as of 2025, while customers are redirected to use ARES CAD.

== History ==
CorelCAD was first released in May 2011 based on the ARES engine developed by Graebert, a German company. Upon release, it was priced at $699 only.

Unlike other Corel products, CorelCAD is not included in any packages including the CorelDRAW Graphic Suite and WordPerfect Office.

CorelCAD is no longer sold as of 2025.

== Features ==
CorelCAD contains all the necessary features of a computer-aided design (CAD) application, but lacks the advanced features which can be found in Autodesk AutoCAD. It can support graphics formats such as DWG, CDR, DXF, SHP, and more.

Compared to AutoCAD, CorelCAD has a cleaner and easier interface to use and learn. However, it lacks the robust features in AutoCAD.
