= MindManager =

Commercial mind mapping software

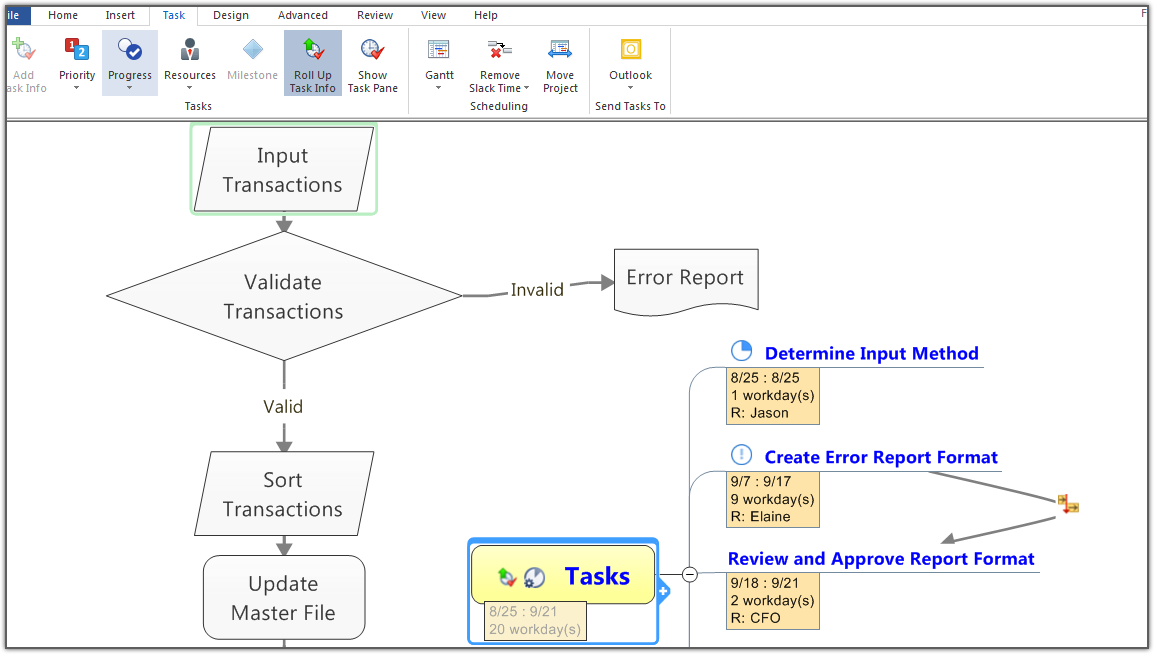
- MindManager 2016 for Windows
- Developer: Mindjet
- Initial release: 1998; 27 years ago

Stable release(s) [±]
- Windows: 25.0.208 / 16 September 2025; 2 months ago
- macOS: 25.0.125 / 16 September 2025; 2 months ago
- Operating system: Windows, macOS, Android, iOS, web
- Type: Mind mapping
- License: Proprietary commercial software
- Website: www.mindmanager.com/en/

MindManager is a commercial mind mapping software application developed by Mindjet. The software provides ways for users to visualize information in mind maps and flowcharts. MindManager can be used to manage projects, organize information, and for brainstorming.

As of December 2015, Mindjet had approximately two million users, including notable customers such as Coca-Cola, Disney, IBM, and Wal-Mart.

== Features ==
MindManager provides ways for users to visualize information using mind maps, and with the release of MindManager 2016 for Windows, now includes flowchart and concept map creation tools. The digital mind maps can be used as a “virtual whiteboard” for brainstorming, managing and planning projects, compiling research, organizing large amounts of information, and for strategic planning. MindManager also has features that allow budget calculations and formulas, Gantt chart views of project timelines, and guided brainstorming. Documents can be attached to mind map topics and viewed within the MindManager application. Links, images, and notes can also be added to mind map topics and viewed and searched in a side panel.

== Development ==
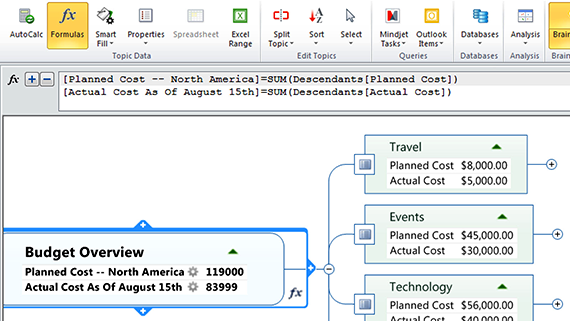
Formulas in MindManager

The software that became MindManager was originally developed by Mike Jetter in the mid-1990s while he was recovering from a bone marrow transplant to treat leukemia. Jetter's goal was to develop a program that would overcome the limitations of creating mind maps with pen and paper, such as the inability to easily move items around. Following his release from hospital, Jetter decided to sell the software. The software's mind maps were initially based on the method created by Tony Buzan. Over time, however, Mindjet has developed its own style of mind mapping.

The software was originally marketed under the name "MindMan — The Creative MindManager". In 1999, it was rebranded as MindManager. Originally only available for Windows, MindManager expanded to Mac OS X in 2006. With the release of version 7, the Windows version of MindManager adopted the ribbon interface first seen in Microsoft Office 2007 and introduced support for Office Open XML. In 2011, mobile versions of MindManager were released for both iOS and Android. Later that year, the company acquired Thinking Space, an Android-based information mapping application, and Cohuman, a social task management service, which the company developed into a collaborative, cloud-based service to complement MindManager called Mindjet Connect or Project Director.

In September 2012, the Mindjet company combined all of its software, including MindManager, Mindjet Connect, and its mobile offerings into a single product, also called Mindjet.

Mindjet moved away from the single-product offering in mid-2013. The stand-alone mind mapping product was again named MindManager, with a more expansive version tailored to large enterprise adoptions called MindManager Enterprise released in 2014. MindManager Enterprise added sharing options including viewing/editing within Microsoft SharePoint. A MindManager mind map viewer also became available with MindManager Enterprise 2016.

On August 9, 2016, Corel announced that they had acquired the Mindjet MindManager business.

== Reception and awards ==
MindManager has received generally positive notice from reviewers. MindManager 2016 for Windows took first place in Biggerplate's MindMapper's Choice poll. MindManager 8 received four out of five stars from TechRadar, while MindManager 9 received 3.5 out of 5 stars from PC Magazine and 4 out of 5 stars from Macworld. MindManager was chosen as one of the top 5 best mind mapping tools.

MindManager also received a number of awards, including "Collaboration Product of the Year" for 2008 by Intranet Journal, a Jolt Productivity award for Design and Modeling tools from Dr. Dobb's Journal, and "Best of CeBIT" in the Personal Software category in 2004.

== See also ==
- Brainstorming
- List of concept- and mind-mapping software
