= DVD Flick =

DVD authoring software

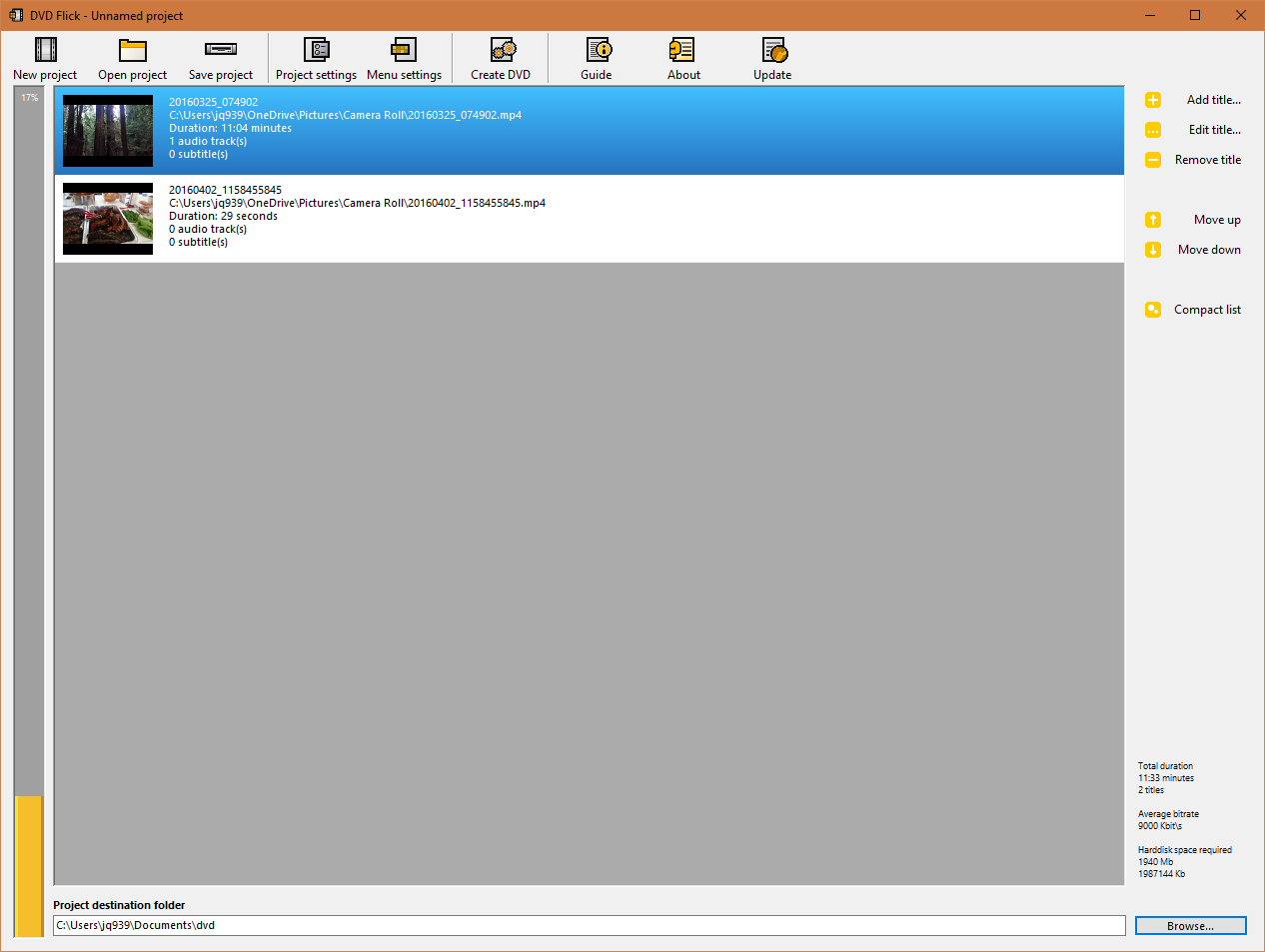
- Developer: Dennis Meuwissen
- Final release: 1.3.0.7 / June 26, 2009; 16 years ago
- Written in: Visual Basic 6
- Operating system: Microsoft Windows
- Available in: English
- Type: Optical disc authoring
- License: GNU General Public License
- Website: www.dvdflick.net

DVD Flick is an open source DVD authoring application for Windows developed by Dennis Meuwissen and released under the GNU General Public License. DVD Flick is capable of importing audio tracks, video files and subtitles, composing a DVD-Video movie and burning it to a disc – or creating an ISO image for later burning.

DVD Flick supports 53 container formats, 42 different types of audio codecs and 72 different types of video codecs, including Windows Media formats, RealMedia, QuickTime, AVI, Flash Video and various MPEG-compliant formats. DVD Flick is also capable of importing four subtitle formats, namely SubStation Alpha (.ssa/.ass), MicroDVD (.sub), SubRip (.srt) and SubView.

Although DVD Flick does not feature video editing capabilities, it can read and interpret AviSynth scripts and create simple menus. DVD Flick uses FFmpeg to encode DVD-Video.

DVD Flick features direct stream copy for DVD-compliant MPEG-2 video streams only, but such a feature is not available for audio streams, meaning audio streams are always re-encoded in the process of DVD creation.

PC World has praised DVD Flick, awarding it a rating of 5 out of 5.

== See also ==
- DVD authoring
- List of DVD authoring applications
