= Ulead PhotoImpact =

Raster and vector graphics editing program

Corel PhotoImpact
- Working desktop within PhotoImpact with the About screen in the foreground, running under Windows 7
- Developer: Ulead
- Stable release: 13 / 2008; 18 years ago
- Operating system: Windows
- Type: Raster graphics editor
- License: Trialware, SaaS
- Website: http://www.paintshoppro.com/en/products/photoimpact/

Ulead PhotoImpact (originally called Iedit) was a raster and vector graphics editing program published by Ulead Systems.

Alongside its image editing capabilities, the program also featured HTML tools, such as a rollover assistant, an imagemap assistant, an HTML assistant, a background designer and a button library. PhotoImpact also used Photoshop filters in .8bf format.

PhotoImpact had vast support for graphic file formats but also used its own UFO and UFP file format which supported all the aforementioned features.

The last version of PhotoImpact released in 2008 was X3/13.

In December 2006 Corel acquired Ulead Systems. Corel continued to market PhotoImpact until September 2009 when they discontinued the product, focusing on the competing product Paint Shop Pro. Though development has been halted, the product is still being sold by Corel. A version of PhotoImpact licensed as PhotoImpact Pro is sold by Nova Development. It is a rebranded version of PhotoImpact with no program differences. However, while the Ulead and Corel specs omit Windows 7, the Nova specs in 2014 mention that Windows 7 and Windows 8.x are supported.

For users, there are various help forums and tutorial banks available, both factory and non-factory.

== Release history ==
Version	Release date	Reference
PhotoImpact 3	1996	
PhotoImpact 4	1997	
PhotoImpact 5	1999	
PhotoImpact 6	2000	
PhotoImpact 7	2001	
PhotoImpact 8	2002	
PhotoImpact XL SE (8.5)	2003	
PhotoImpact 10	2004	
PhotoImpact 11	2005	
PhotoImpact 12	2006	
PhotoImpact 13 (or X3)	2008	
