= Corel AfterShot Pro =

Raw image processing software

- Developer(s): Alludo
- Stable release: 3.7.0.446 / January 28, 2021; 4 years ago
- Operating system: Microsoft Windows, Linux, OS X
- Type: Photo post-production
- License: Proprietary
- Website: www.aftershotpro.com

Corel AfterShot Pro is a commercial and proprietary raw image processing software by Alludo (formerly Corel Corporation). It is based on Bibble, which Corel acquired. It is notable among commercial raw software for offering a native and up to date Linux version. Version 2 was released on the March 21, 2014. Version 3 was released on the May 11, 2016.

Corel also offers a version for Windows and Mac without the "Pro" suffix, Corel AfterShot. Corel AfterShot is more limited, and does not include "Perfectly Clear Noise Removal" or HDR processing.
