= Hallmark Connections Card Studio =

Software CD-ROM from Micrografx

- Developer: Micrografx
- Release: 1995
- Operating system: Windows

Hallmark Connections Card Studio is a software CD-ROM from Micrografx. It was developed in conjunction with Hallmark Cards, and American Greeting Cards Corp.

== Summary ==
Hallmark Connections Card Studio lets users customize their own cards by editing words and pictures. Announcements, invitations, signs, and certificates can also be created.

== Reception ==
CNET found Hallmark Connections Card Studio to be worth a visit. The Sydney Morning Herald called Hallmark Connections Card Studio a fun program to use.
