= Ulead MediaStudio Pro =

- Developer: Ulead Systems
- Release: 1993
- Stable release: 8.10.0039 (final) / June 2, 2006 (8.1 Service Pack)
- Operating system: Microsoft Windows
- Type: Video editing
- License: Proprietary
- Website: Ulead: MediaStudio Pro

Ulead MediaStudio Pro (MSP) is real-time, timeline based prosumer level video editing software by Ulead Systems. It is a suite of 5 digital video and audio applications, including: Video Capture, Video Paint, CG Infinity, Audio Editor and Video Editor. MSP is only available on the Windows platform.

Since version 8.0, CG Infinity and Video Paint are separate from the MSP suite, and are being sold as a combination product called VideoGraphics Lab (VGL).

On June 18, 2008, Corel formally announced that MediaStudio Pro would be discontinued. The final MediaStudio Pro version was 8.10.0039 (Pro 8 Service Pack 1) released June 2, 2006. Corel discontinued support for MediaStudio Pro in June 2009.

Version 6.0 is last version to support Windows 95, although recent versions are not compatible with Windows Vista or Windows 7.

== Modules ==
There are 5 stand-alone modules in MSP before version 8.0, they are:

- Video Capture – The video capturing module in MSP.
- Video Paint – A frame-by-frame editor which can let user to make some image or hand-drawing effects on video frames.
- CG Infinity – A vector-based video editing tool which allows user to create logo animation or vector graphics on video frames.
- Audio Editor – The audio editing tool in MSP. It can utilize DirectX audio filters and Ulead audio filters to do audio effect processing.
- Video Editor – The module that users do video editing with audio/video effects. It can also utilize DirectX audio filters and 3rd party video filters to do the video editing.

Since version 8.0, CG Infinity and Video Paint have been separated from the MSP suite and are being sold as a combination product called VideoGraphics Lab (VGL).

== Editions ==
Ulead MediaStudio Pro had several editions before version 7.0. They are:

- Full edition: this edition includes all 5 modules.
- Director's Cut edition: this edition has 3 modules including Video Capture, Video Editor and Audio Editor.
- SE edition: SE means Simple Edition or Special Edition and is an OEM bundle version. It also includes the 3 modules as Director's Cut, however, is feature limited. Sometimes it will be given freely in video magazines.

After version 7.0 only Full edition is available in the MSP suite.

On June 18, 2008, Corel formally announced that MediaStudio Pro would be discontinued.

== Release history ==
Version	Release form	Release date	Significant changes
2.5		c. 1997	
5.2	?	c. 1999	?
6.0	?	January 2000	Customization support for workspace UI; Full DV support; MPEG-2 support
6.5	?	August 2001	
7.0	Package	?	?
7.1	Service pack	?.	Support MPEG hardware encoding using Canopus StormEncoder.
7.2	Service pack	?	?
7.3	Service pack	?	?
8.0	Package	September 20, 2005	Improved High Definition Video support.; Support Proxy Editing.; Redesigned user interface.; Smart Compositor; No longer support MPEG hardware encoding using Canopus StormEncoder.
8.1	Service pack	June 6, 2006	?

== See also ==
- Comparison of video editing software
- Ulead Systems
