= Stuart Carlson =

American cartoonist (1955–2022)

Stuart Carlson (September 1955 – June 10, 2022) was an American editorial cartoonist who worked for the Milwaukee Journal Sentinel. His cartoons usually followed the moderate editorial stance of that paper.

== Biography ==
Carlson was raised in West Bend, Wisconsin and earned a Bachelor of Fine Arts degree in 1978 at the University of Wisconsin–Milwaukee. After graduating, Carlson worked as a cartoonist for the West Allis Post/Star and as a reporter for the West Bend News.

Carlson came to the Milwaukee Sentinel in 1983, and stayed with the company after it merged with the Milwaukee Journal in 1995. During the course of his career there his awards included the 1995 John Fischetti Award; his selection as the nation's best cartoonist in 1991 by the National Press Foundation; numerous best cartoon of the year honors from the Milwaukee Press Club; the 1986 Robert W. Gillespie Sentinel Staff Award for Excellence; and the 1988 UWM's Young Alumni Award.

Carlson accepted a buyout from the Journal Sentinel, and departed from the paper on August 1, 2008. As of 2009, Carlson did freelance work and illustrated a humor column for UWM Today, the alumni magazine of his alma mater.

His work, distributed to approximately 35 newspapers by the Universal Press Syndicate, has appeared in The New York Times, Newsweek, The Washington Post, Barron's, Playboy and on ABC News' Nightline.
