= ABC FlowCharter =

- Screenshot of ABC FlowCharter version 1.1
- Developer: Micrografx
- Initial release: 25 August 1989; 36 years ago
- Written in: MS-DOS
- Operating system: Windows
- License: Proprietary license
- Website: www.qbssoftware.com/product/igrafx-flowcharter/

ABC FlowCharter is a flowchart program originally from Texas-based Micrografx, Inc. The trademark for this software was filed on August 25, 1989, and registered in January 1991. It is also known as Micrografx FlowCharter and iGrafx FlowCharter.

Version 4.0 of ABC FlowCharter was released in 1995. It integrated the ABC ToolKit software from Micrografx and included new diagramming tools and templates. The software added intelligent line routing, which automatically routed connecting lines around other shapes. This software was compatible with an IBM 386 computer with Windows 3.1, 5 Mb of RAM, a VGA monitor, and it required 21 Mb of hard disk space.

Following the acquisition of Micrografx by the Canadian company Corel in 2001, ABC FlowCharter was then maintained by the separate business unit iGrafx, formed in 2003. The software package was renamed to "iGrafx FlowCharter 2003". As of 2018, the currently available version of this software package is "iGrafx FlowCharter".
