= Ulead Systems =

Software company

Ulead Systems, Inc. 友立資訊
- Type: Subsidiary
- Industry: Software publishing
- Founded: Taipei, Taiwan (5 August 1989)
- Headquarters: Taipei, Taiwan
- Key people: Lotus Chen, Founder; Way-Zen Chen, Founder; Lewis Liaw, Founder; Steve Ro, Chairman; Eldon Liu, CEO
- Products: Computer software
- Revenue: USD 34.46 million (2005)
- Number of employees: 287 in Ulead Headquarters (31 January 2006)
- Parent: corel
- Website: www.videostudiopro.com

Ulead Systems (Chinese: 友立資訊; Chinese: iú-li̍p-chu-sìn; pinyin: Yǒulì Zīxùn) was a Taiwanese computer software company headquartered in the Neihu District of Taipei, Taiwan. The company was well-known for developing popular multimedia software, including VideoStudio. Following a series of corporate acquisitions, its product lines and development teams were integrated into Corel, where they remain part of Corel's creativity software portfolio.

== History ==
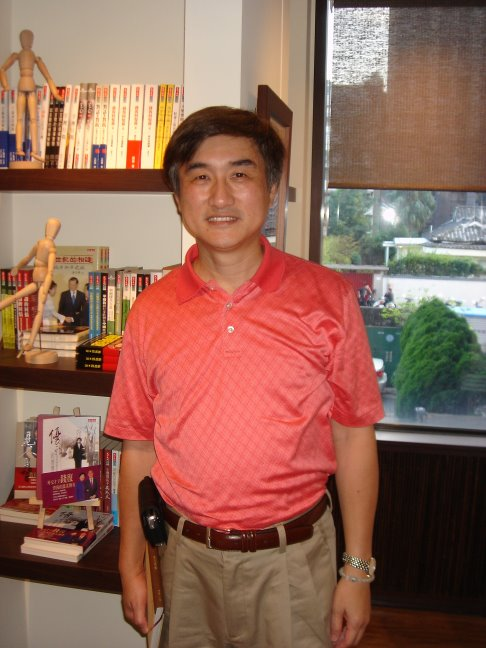
Lewis Liaw in 2006

Ulead was founded on 5 August 1989 by Lotus Chen, Lewis Liaw and Way-Zen Chen. They founded Ulead with the support of Microtek after leaving Taiwan's Institute for Information Industry in order to further develop and commercialize their first true color image editing software, PhotoStyler, on the Windows platform.

Ulead sold PhotoStyler through Aldus Corporation as a software developer. However, Aldus merged into Adobe Systems in 1994 and PhotoStyler is no longer available. Ulead then continued to develop PhotoImpact 3 as its flagship image editor and sell PhotoImpact by itself.

Ulead Systems then extended its development of multimedia software in various areas such as video editing, media management, web utility, DVD authoring and digital home.

On 17 September 2001, Ulead was listed on the Taiwan Stock Exchange as 2487.TW.

On 13 April 2005, InterVideo acquired Ulead Systems for approximately $68 million. On 9 July 2006, InterVideo announced its merger with Ulead to be completed on 28 December 2006.

On 28 August 2006, Corel announced that it would acquire InterVideo for about $196 million.

On 24 October 2006, Ulead was unlisted on the Taiwan Stock Exchange.

On 12 December 2006, Corel announced the acquisition of InterVideo and Ulead had been completed.

== Products ==
Following the acquisition by Corel, most of Ulead's software products were phased out or discontinued, and currently, only VideoStudio remains on the market.

=== Current Products ===
- VideoStudio – Active consumer-tier video editing software (originally Ulead VideoStudio).

=== Legacy Products ===
- MediaStudio Pro / VideoGraphics Lab – Professional video editing and effects software.
- VideoTool Box
- COOL 3D, COOL 3D Production Studio – 3D text and motion graphics animation software.

==== DVD / Disc Authoring ====
- Burn.Now – Disc-burning utility integrated into later Ulead software suites.
- DVD MovieFactory – Consumer DVD and Blu-ray authoring software .
- DVD PictureShow
- DVD WorkShop – Professional-level DVD authoring software.

==== Image / Graphics ====
- COOL 360 – Panoramic image stitching software.
- PhotoImpact – Flagship raster graphics and image editing editor, discontinued after version X3.
- IPhoto Plus
- Photo Explorer
- Photo Express
- Pick-A-Photo
- My Scrapbook

==== Web Utility ====
- GIF Animator – Web-focused GIF animation software. (Official Features PDF)
- GIF-X.Plug-in
- Menu.Applet
- SmartSaver Pro

==== Pocket Software ====
- Pocket SlideShow
- Pocket DV Show

==== Digital home ====
- InstaMedia

== See also ==
- List of companies of Taiwan
- InterVideo
- Corel
