= Corel Designer =

Vector-based graphics program

- Website: www.coreldraw.com

Corel DESIGNER is a vector-based graphics program. It was originally developed by Micrografx, which was bought by Corel in 2001.

The last version developed by Micrografx was 9.0 in 2001. This program was later sold as Corel DESIGNER 9. There are still a number of users who continue working with version 9.0, because newer versions of the product are based on a modified CorelDRAW rather than the original product.

Corel DESIGNER is effective for the creation of engineering drawings, but also offers many functions for graphic design. Starting with version X5, Corel DESIGNER Technical Suite includes Corel Designer, CorelDRAW and Corel Photo-Paint. X6 was the last release for Windows XP.

== Release history and file formats ==
Manufacturer	Product name	Release year	Filename extension	Label
Micrografx	In-A-Vision	1986	*.drw	Draw
Micrografx	Designer 3.0	1990	*.drw	Draw
Micrografx	Designer 3.1	1992	*.drw	Draw
Micrografx	Designer 4.0	1993	*.ds4	Designer Version 4.0
Micrografx	Designer 4.1	Dec 1994	*.ds4	Designer Version 4.1
Micrografx	Designer 6.0	Sep 1995	*.dsf	Designer Format
Micrografx	Designer 7.1	Nov 1997	*.dsf	Designer Format
IGrafx	Designer 8.0	2000	*.dsf	Designer Format
Micrografx	Designer 9.0	2001	*.dsf	Designer Format
Corel	Corel DESIGNER 9 (9.02)	2002	*.dsf	Designer Format
Corel	Corel DESIGNER 10	2003	*.des	Designer
Corel	Corel DESIGNER Technical Suite 12	2006	*.des	Designer
Corel	Corel DESIGNER Technical Suite X4	2008	*.des	Designer
Corel	Corel DESIGNER Technical Suite X5	2010	*.des	Designer
Corel	CorelDRAW Technical Suite X6	2013	*.des	Designer
Corel	CorelDRAW Technical Suite X7	2014	*.des	Designer
Corel	CorelDRAW Technical Suite 2017	2017	*.des	Designer
Corel	CorelDRAW Technical Suite 2019	June 11 2019	*.des	Designer
Corel	CorelDRAW Technical Suite 2020	June 9 2020	*.des	Designer
