= Bleeker: The Rechargeable Dog =

American comic strip by Jonathan Mahood

- Author: Jonathan Mahood
- Current status/schedule: Current daily & Sunday strip
- Launch date: 2006
- Alternate name: Hoover: The Rechargeable Dog (2006–2007)
- Syndicate(s): GoComics (2007–2011); King Features Syndicate (2011–present)
- Genre: Humor

Bleeker: The Rechargeable Dog is a comic strip by Jonathan Mahood about ten-year-old Skip Smalls, his friend Lila, and Bleeker, his electronic dog. The strip is distributed by King Features Syndicate.

== Publication history ==
In July 2006, Mahood's comic strip began online as Hoover: The Rechargeable Dog. The strip was picked up by GoComics in 2007, and Mahood titled it Bleeker in honor of his grandfather's middle name.

Originally syndicated by Andrews McMeel Universal's GoComics for four years, it moved to King Features on January 3, 2011. It is also available on King Features' DailyINK service. It has been translated weekly for Germany's national weekly newspaper Die Zeit.

When the strip switched syndicates, it was relaunched, as detailed by Mahood:

This fresh start will be exactly that… on January 3rd 2011, Skip will meet Bleeker for the first time. The comic will restart from the beginning to allow new readers a chance to get to know the characters just as the characters themselves, get to know each other. To be clear, this doesn't mean I'm going to rerun 4 1/2 years of comics. That would be boring for longtime readers and also for me too! For the first month and a half I have reworked some introductory strips and added a bunch of new ones. I hope this brief introductory period will be fun for longtime fans as well. Knowing Bleeker's ineptitude for all things canine and Skip's ineptitude in general should make for an extra layer of fun with these early comics. Look for Karl, the angry robot vacuum cleaner, to make his first appearance early in the new year. It's not often you get a chance to start over, so for me it's been great to iron out some of those early wrinkles and know that moving forward, everything will fit together.
