= Lotus Word Pro =

Word processing software

- Developer: Lotus Development
- Initial release: 1988; 38 years ago
- Stable release: 9.8 + Fixpack 6 / 2007; 19 years ago
- Operating system: Microsoft Windows
- Type: Word processor
- License: Proprietary
- Website: Word Pro Archived August 19, 2007, at the Wayback Machine

Lotus Word Pro is a word processor produced by Lotus Development for use on Microsoft Windows-compatible computers and on IBM OS/2 Warp. Word Pro was available as part of the Lotus SmartSuite office suite.

Word Pro was based upon Ami Pro (originally developed by Samna), but was substantially rewritten (including a new native document format). The predecessor to Ami Pro, Amí, was released in 1988, and was the first fully functional Windows word processor (Microsoft Word for Windows was released in early 1989). Shortly after the release of Amí, the development team added support for tables and renamed the software Ami Pro.

Lotus obtained Ami Pro to round out their office suite by acquiring Samna in 1990. Lotus continued to develop Ami Pro further, with version 3 released in 1992; all versions were 16 bit. Version 3.1 is the last version of Ami Pro released. The Windows versions of Ami Pro were also bundled with Adobe Type Manager for Windows, as Windows had poor support for scalable fonts before the introduction of TrueType.

In 1994, Joe Guthridge was one of seven awarded the Windows Pioneer Award for feedback which the Ami development team gave to Microsoft during the early development of Windows.

IBM took over development of Word Pro after acquiring Lotus Development in 1995. The last version of Word Pro was 9.8 Fixpack 6 from 2007, according to users compatible with all Windows versions from Windows 95 to Windows 11.

== See also ==
- Comparison of office suites
