= Micrografx =

American graphics software company, 1982–2001

Micrografx Inc.
- Founded: 1982
- Founder: Paul Grayson, George Grayson
- Defunct: July 16, 2001
- Successor: Corel
- Headquarters: Richardson, Texas, United States
- Parent: Corel (2001)

Micrografx Inc. was an American software company based in Richardson, Texas, founded in 1982 by Paul and George Grayson. It was one of the earliest developers of graphics software for Microsoft Windows, shipping its first product for Windows 1.0 in 1986 and building a broad range of drawing, diagramming and image editing tools aimed at both business users and graphics professionals. Corel acquired the company in 2001 and absorbed its product lines into the Corel portfolio.

== History ==
Micrografx was founded in 1982 and was among the first companies to develop commercial graphics software targeting the nascent Windows platform. Its vector drawing application, originally released as In*A*Vision for Windows 1.0 in 1986, was renamed Micrografx Designer with version 2 in 1990 and became a widely used tool for technical illustration and diagramming.

In 1992, Micrografx acquired Roykore Inc and its ABC Suite, which included ABC Flowcharter and ABC Orgchart. The company expanded further in 1997 by acquiring AdvanEdge Technologies of Tualatin, Oregon and its process simulation software, Optima!, for $3.5 million. In 1999, the combined business process and diagramming products were consolidated and shipped as iGrafx v8.

By the mid-1990s, Micrografx competed directly with Corel for Windows graphics users. While CorelDRAW targeted graphics professionals, Micrografx's ABC Graphics Suite was positioned towards general business users.

Corel acquired Micrografx on 16 July 2001, integrating the graphics product line — including Micrografx Picture Publisher and Micrografx Designer — into the Corel portfolio. Micrografx Designer was continued as Corel Designer. The business process analysis products were subsequently spun out in 2003 as the separate company iGrafx.

== Products ==
- Micrografx Designer — vector graphics editor, originally released as In*A*Vision for Windows 1.0 in 1986
- Micrografx Picture Publisher — raster graphics editor
- ABC FlowCharter — diagramming software
- ABC Graphics Suite — business graphics bundle (1995) including ABC Flowcharter, Designer, Picture Publisher and ABC Media Manager
- Micrografx Charisma — charting application
- Micrografx Windows Draw — desktop publishing application
- Micrografx Simply 3D — 3D graphics tool
- Micrografx Webtricity — web graphics tool
- Optima! — process simulation software (acquired from AdvanEdge Technologies)
- Crayola Art — consumer drawing application
- Hallmark Connections Card Studio
