= Aldus PhotoStyler =

Raster graphics editor

Aldus PhotoStyler was a graphics software program developed by the Taiwanese company Ulead. Released in June 1991 as the first 24 bit image editor for Windows, it was bought the same year by the Aldus Prepress group. Its main competition was Adobe Photoshop. Version 2.0 (late 1993) introduced a new user interface and improved color calibration. PhotoStyler SE - lacking some features of the version 2.0 - was bundled with scanners like HP ScanJet. The product disappeared from the Adobe product line after Adobe acquired Aldus in 1994.
