= Application posture =

The term application posture characterizes the nature of a software application's interaction with its user.

The term was coined by Alan Cooper, who characterized four 'postures' for applications: sovereign, transient, daemonic and parasitic.

- A sovereign application is a program that monopolizes the user's attention for long periods of time.
- Cooper defined transient applications thus: 'A transient posture program comes and goes, presenting a single, high-relief function with a tightly restricted set of accompanying controls. The program is called when needed, it appears and performs its job, then it quickly leaves, letting the user continue her more normal activity, usually a sovereign application.'
- Daemonic applications are background processes that require no direct user interaction.
- Parasitic or Auxiliary applications are similar to transient applications in providing a limited, focused set of functionality and occupy a small space, but they are shown persistently and can be used for a long period of time.

== See also ==
- Desk accessory
- Helper application

=== Bibliography ===
- About Face by Cooper, Alan, Reimann, Robert & Cronin, David ISBN 978-0-470-08411-3, 2007
- Ernest Kinsolving & Jörg Beringer. "The Posture of Portals". sapdesignguild.org.
- O Moravcik; D Petrik; T Skripcak; P Schreiber. "Elements of the Modern Application Software Development" (PDF).
