= Mindjet =

American mind mapping software company

- Industry: Work management software
- Founded: 1998
- Founder: Mike and Bettina Jetter
- Headquarters: San Francisco, United States
- Area served: Worldwide
- Products: Mindjet (a combination of products - MindManager and SpigitEngage)
- Owner: Corel
- Website: www.mindjet.com

Mindjet is a mind mapping and innovation management software company headquartered in San Francisco, California. Mindjet's software products, including its flagship product MindManager and SpigitEngage, are designed to visually and collaboratively manage information and tasks. As of June 2016, Mindjet had approximately sixteen million users.

== Company history ==
Mindjet was founded in 1998 by computer programmer Mike Jetter and his wife, Bettina Jetter, in order to support the development of their mind mapping software, MindManager. Jetter conceived of the idea for the first product while recovering from an illness in hospital, and began developing the program while living in Germany in 1994, aiming to simplify the creation and sharing of mind maps for business users. In August 2001, Mindjet received approximately $5 million in venture capital from London-based investment group 3i, which the company used to market MindManager in the U.S. and Europe. Scott Raskin, the former chief operating officer for Telelogic, was named CEO of Mindjet in 2006.

In 2011, the company acquired Thinking Space, an Android-based information mapping application, and Cohuman, a social task management service. The acquisition of Cohuman enabled Mindjet to launch a new collaborative working service called Mindjet Connect on September 22, 2011.

As of December 2011 Mindjet had 270 employees. The company's headquarters are located in San Francisco; it also has offices in Australia, France, Germany, Japan, Switzerland and the United Kingdom. The company is led by a board of directors including founder Mike Jetter, managing director of Investor Growth Capital, Noah Walley, and former Visio Corporation CEO, Jeremy Jaech.

In 2013, Mindjet acquired innovation management company Spigit, and adopted their software product SpigitEngage into their product suite.

In 2016, Mindmanager was acquired by Corel for an undisclosed amount.

== Products and services ==
Mindjet develops mind mapping and innovation management software for Microsoft Windows and Mac OS, and for both Apple iOS and Android mobile devices.

Until 2012, the company's products focused on mind mapping, collaboration and project management. The company's MindManage displayed information in mind maps using colors, words, images and spatial relationships. Following the acquisition of Cohuman in 2011, Mindjet launched Mindjet Connect, a cloud-based service for collaborative working.

In December 2011, Mindjet reported 350,000 downloads for its iOS app and 1.1 million downloads for its Android-based app.

In September 2012, the company combined its existing products into a single product named |Mindjet and changed from a purchase-based model to a subscription-based model.

In September 2013, Mindjet acquired Pleasanton, California–based startup Spigit, and added their SpigitEngage enterprise innovation management software to the Mindjet product suite.
