= Samna =

Samna is a word processor created in the 1980s developed and published by Samna Corporation. Samna was principally founded by Said Mohammadioun in Atlanta, Georgia, in December 1982. It was acquired by Lotus Development in 1990.

== Description ==
Samna competed with WordStar and MultiMate in the IBM PC compatibles market for word processors in the 1980s. Based in large part on the look and feel of the Lanier Worldwide dedicated word processor's software, Samna was targeted at businesses which had used the Lanier system but were interested in moving to lower cost word processors.

Samna was developed and published by Samna Corp., an Atlanta-based computer software company. By 1985 it was reportedly competing well with MultiMate and market leader WordStar, by focusing on corporate sales. Samna was bought by Lotus Development in November 1990 for US$65 million.Samna had many strengths, but was regularly criticized in reviews over speed issues. Even before GUI environments like Windows, it pioneered treating the empty editing screen as a 'scratchpad', that is, a space that you could cursor into, placing a character or other entry anywhere at will on a printable page. In WordPerfect and Word, and virtually all other editors of that period, territory beyond the last character entered did not exist. When the Hercules graphics card became popular, Samna Word gained a Print Preview mode that was not editable, but showed font and format treatments.

Samna also developed the Amí and Ami Professional word processors. Amí, a graphical word processor, in 1988 was the first Windows-based word processor on the market and it supported WYSIWYG - What You See Is What You Get (Word for Windows did not debut until 1989). The Windows 3.0 version was being shipped when Lotus acquired the company, and Ami Pro was folded into Lotus's product line, first becoming Lotus Ami Pro, and then later evolving into Lotus Word Pro. The extension of Ami Pro files, .sam, is a legacy of Samna.

== Feature growth ==
In the era when even disk space, let alone main memory, wasn't yet measured in Gigabytes, the 1991 expansion for "as many fonts as disk space permits, instead of the 30 maximum allowed in previous product versions" was considered important.

Also, in that era, printer vendors and specific models were supported individually, rather than via Windows-based device-independence. The announcement also included "increased support for laser printers."

Specific features were by then a matter of checklists for reviewers and marketing material, as per the 1986 Version III.

== From Samna to IBM ==
The DOS versions of Samna competed with WordStar, Wordperfect, DisplayWrite, MultiMate, and Microsoft Word; WordPerfect and Wordstar were the leaders.

With the shift to Windows, the two market leaders were Ami Pro and MS Word for Windows, although Wordperfect still retained its lead in the then-declining DOS market.

Lotus was subsequently acquired by IBM, which was also marketing DisplayWrite. Meanwhile "Ami Pro (for Windows) achieved a far greater market share than its previous DOS incarnations."

== Reception ==
Edward Mendelson in summer 1985 in The Yale Review advised "journalists, essayists, and scholars, novelists, dramatists, and poets" who would be "wholesale cutting, adding, and rewriting" to avoid the "designed for office correspondence" and "excruciatingly slow" Samna Word. It "seems designed to be sold rather than used", he said, with "almost entirely worthless" features.
