= Amí =

Word processing program

Ami
- Original author: Samna
- Developer: Samna
- Initial release: 1988; 38 years ago
- Stable release: 1.2
- Type: Word processor

Ami was the name of a word processing program developed and marketed by Samna in the late 1980s, which was later purchased by Lotus Development in 1990. Shortly after its introduction, the name of the program was changed to "Ami Pro".

Ami Pro was a significant competitor to Microsoft Word and WordPerfect Corporation's WordPerfect during the late 1980s and early 1990s. Dataquest estimated that Ami Pro had 18% of the Windows word processor market in 1991. The developers of Ami Pro introduced a number of innovations in Ami Pro that were later adopted by other word processors.

At the time that Ami Pro was introduced, the word processing market was dominated by WordPerfect. Both Ami Pro and Microsoft Word made inroads into WordPerfect's market share. Eventually, Microsoft Word overtook WordPerfect as the dominant player, and Ami Pro was discontinued.

IBM, which acquired Lotus in 1995, renamed Ami Pro Lotus Word Pro.

== Overview ==
The 16-bit Ami Pro had significant limitations, most notably that it was unable to display the bottom of one page and the top of the next at the same time. The limitations were so severe that Lotus completely re-wrote the program from scratch when developing the 32-bit version for Windows 95.

The 16-bit Ami Pro had significant benefits, too. It was possible to easily control formatting with paragraph styles that were set with function keys, and were locked in for the whole paragraph. (They were not erased with the deletion of the last character of the paragraph, as they are with Microsoft Word.)

Ami Pro used .SAM as its file extension, while Lotus Word Pro used .LWP.
