= Corel =

Software company headquartered in Ottawa, Ontario

Corel Corporation

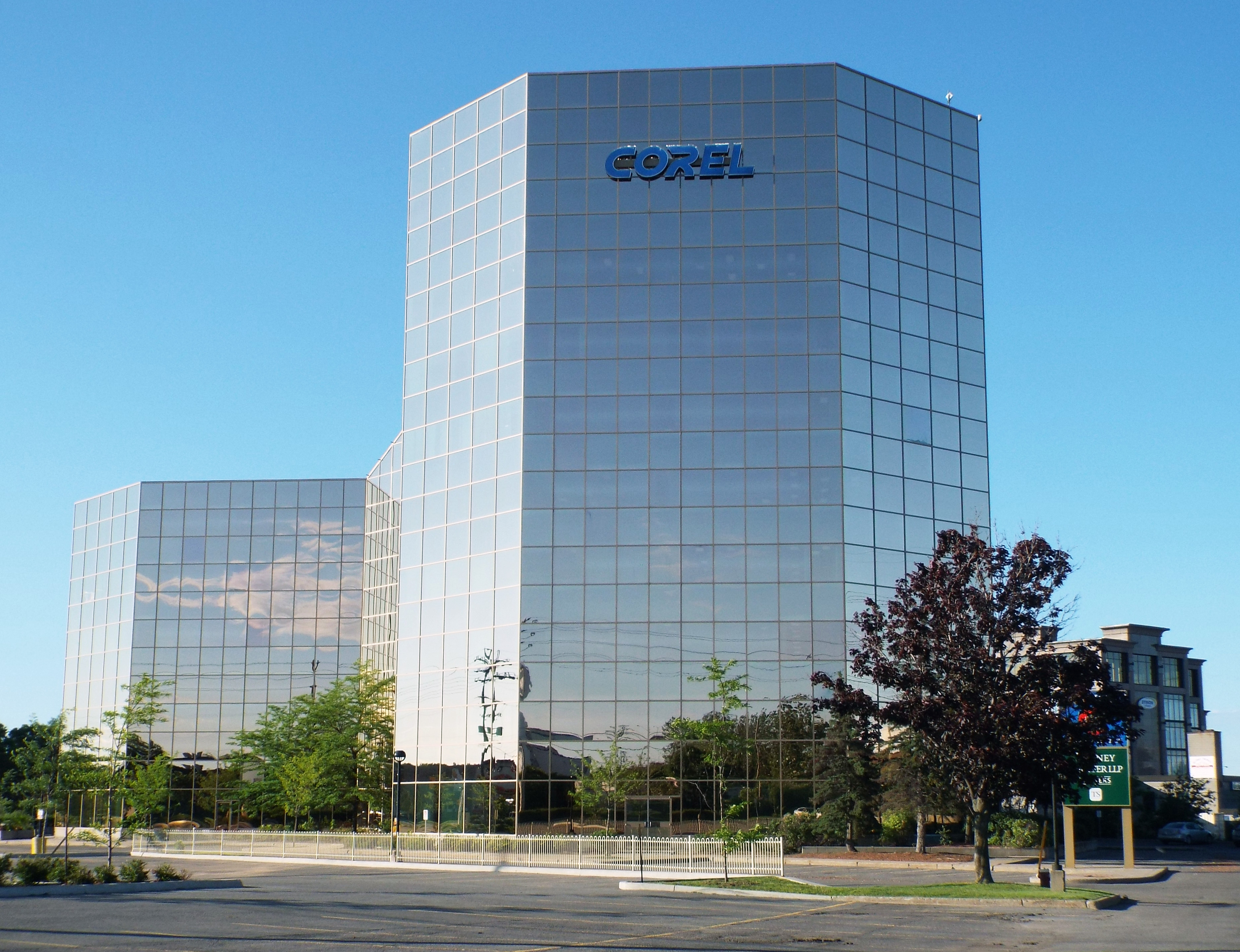
- Former Corel headquarters in Ottawa
- Trade name: Alludo (2022–2025)
- Formerly: Cascade Parent Limited (2022–2025)
- Type: Private
- Industry: Software; Programming
- Founded: 1985; 41 years ago
- Founder: Michael Cowpland
- Headquarters: Ottawa, Ontario, Canada
- Key people: Prasannaa Ganesan (CEO)
- Products: WordPerfect; CorelDRAW; WinZip; PaintShop Pro; AfterShot Pro; WinDVD; Painter; MindManager
- Revenue: ▲298 million USD (2016)
- Owner: Vector Capital
- Number of employees: 1,205 (2023)
- Subsidiaries: Roxio; Parallels
- Website: www.alludo.com www.corel.com

Corel Corporation (/kəˈrɛl/ kə-REL; as an abbreviation for "Cowpland Research Laboratory") is a Canadian software company headquartered in Ottawa, Ontario, specializing in graphics processing. The company is known for producing software titles such as CorelDRAW, and for acquiring AfterShot Pro, PaintShop Pro, Painter, Video Studio and WordPerfect.

Corel rebranded as Alludo (/əˈluː.doʊ/ ə-LOO-doh) in 2022. This prompted a trademark infringement lawsuit by Alpenspruce Education Solutions Inc., which was settled in March 2025, with Corel subsequently abandoning its U.S. trademark efforts for the Alludo name. Corel operates internationally under different names including Awingu N.V., WinZip Computing LLC, Cascade Parent Ltd., and Parallels International GmbH.

== History ==
Alludo wordmark used from 2022 to 2025

Corel was founded by Michael Cowpland in 1985 as a research laboratory. Michael Cowpland was CEO of Mitel. Mitel needed writing and creative design programs to enhance the company product line. Corel products were born. Additional products were added. The company had great success early in the high-tech boom of the 1990s with the product CorelDRAW, and became, for a time, the biggest software company in Canada. In 1996, it acquired Novell WordPerfect and started competing with the thought of being "Pepsi to Microsoft's Coke" as Microsoft Word was the top-used word processing software at the time. Corel was in a difficult position as Microsoft pushed pre-loaded copies of its software onto new computers. This mainly consisted of Microsoft Works office applications, but a variant called Works Suite also bundled the Microsoft Word software.

The company held the naming rights to the home arena for the NHL's Ottawa Senators from February 1996 until January 2006 as the "Corel Centre", a venue currently known as the Canadian Tire Centre.

In 1996, Corel created a full motion video game called Mode.

In 1997, Corel sold its Corel ChemLab studio and its "CD Home Collection" consisting of over 60 multimedia titles to Hoffmann + Associates, a Toronto-based company. As part of the deal, Corel acquired a minority interest in Hoffmann + Associates and received royalties.

In August 2000, Cowpland was accused of insider trading and left. A new board of directors was then appointed and Derek Burney Jr., announced that the product line would be split into several brands—DeepWhite, ProCreate, and Corel. However, these plans were scrapped, and only the Corel brand remained. Corel acquired the graphics software company Micrografx in late 2001.

In August 2003, Corel was bought out by the private equity firm Vector Capital for $1.05 a share (slightly more than the cash in the company). The company was voluntarily delisted from the NASDAQ and Toronto Stock Exchanges. Some U.S. shareholders alleged the management benefited from the buyout personally while the buyout price was too low. A lawsuit was filed in the U.S. to stop the buyout and was unsuccessful.

In March 2005, Corel announced that the United States Justice Department purchased 50,000 licenses of WordPerfect (adding to the worldwide user base of 20 million) and that WordPerfect was adding 4 million new users per year thanks to bundling deals with Dell. Corel contended that WordPerfect was the only viable alternative to Microsoft Office, with sales 70 times more than Lotus' SmartSuite. On April 26, 2006, Corel completed its return to the public market with an initial public offering on NASDAQ, the same day finalizing the acquisition of WinZip, an archiving software title.

On December 12, 2006, Corel completed its acquisitions of InterVideo and Ulead. The InterVideo acquisition was valued at around $196 million. In May 2008, CEO David Dobson announced that he was leaving the company to take a senior strategy role at Pitney Bowes. Dobson was replaced on May 8 by former Symantec executive Kris Hagerman. In November 2009, it was announced that Vector Capital would be purchasing the remaining shares of common stock in Corel Corporation. Upon completion, this made Corel once again privately owned. On January 29, 2010, the shareholders of Corel approved its previously announced stock consolidation, completing the transfer to Corel Holdings, L.P., a limited partnership controlled by an affiliate of Vector Capital.

In January 2012, Corel acquired Roxio from Rovi Corporation for an undisclosed amount. Subsequently, on July 2, 2012, Corel announced its acquisition of Pinnacle Systems, a developer of consumer-oriented video editing products (such as the Pinnacle Studio series) owned by Avid.

Having suffered layoffs in 2003 and 2008, Corel began a near yearly culture of restructuring beginning in 2010, when in the latter part of that year the company's finance department was restructured and moved to its Taipei office, resulting in significant layoffs at its Ottawa HQ. Restructuring in 2012 resulted in more layoffs. In December 2013, the company's restructuring resulted in the layoffs of the Taipei location's engineering and quality assurance team. Corel's Taipei office was the core development centre of PaintShop Pro and VideoStudio, one of the company's most well-known photo- and video-editing bundles. The 2013 restructuring led to a partial handover of product development to outsourced companies, resulting in more rapid, low-cost development across its product lines. The company continued with layoffs in 2014 and once again at the beginning of 2015 with the change of the company's CEO to Patrick Nichols, previously the head of Corel's WinZip business unit.

In August 2016, Corel announced the acquisition of the Mindjet MindManager business from Spigit.

In June 2018, Corel announced the acquisition of Gravit GmbH.

In December 2018, Corel announced the acquisition of Parallels.

On July 3, 2019, Corel was acquired by KKR for a reported $1 billion.

In September 2020, Christa Quarles was named the CEO of the company.

In 2021, Prashant Ketkar was named the Chief Technology and Product Officer of the company.

In September 2022, Corel was rebranded to Alludo (wordplay on the phrase "All You Do"). This prompted a trademark infringement lawsuit by Alpenspruce Education Solutions Inc., which was settled in March 2025. Corel's parent company, Cascade Parent Ltd., abandoned the trademark applications for Alludo in June 2025.

In February 2026, Corel was split into two independent companies with Vector Capital acquiring Corel's productivity and creative software businesses and KKR retaining control of virtualization software Parallels.

== Products ==
- CorelCAD – 2D and 3D computer-aided drafting software.
- Corel Chess – using a chess engine developed by Don Dailey and Larry Kaufman.
- Corel Designer – Formerly Micrografx Designer, professional technical illustration software.
- Corel Digital Studio – a set of four applications: PaintShop Photo Express (a light version of Paint Shop Pro), VideoStudio Express (video-editing software), DVD Factory (DVD burning and converting software), WinDVD (DVD player software).
- CorelDRAW – A vector graphics editor.
- Corel Graphics Suite – Combination of CorelDRAW, PhotoPaint, and Capture.
- Corel Home Office – an office suite based on Ability Office 5 and also bundling Corel's WinZip software. It is incompatible with Corel's own WordPerfect file formats.
- Corel KnockOut – Professional image masking plug-in.
- Corel Linux OS (discontinued) – One of the first GUI-based distributions of Linux incorporating an automatic installation program in 1999.
- Corel Paint It! Touch – Drawing and painting software created specifically for Windows 8 touchscreen PCs.
- Corel Painter – a program that emulates natural media – paint, crayons, brushes etc (formerly Fractal Painter).
- Corel Photo Album – A sophisticated program for organizing digital photographs, inherited from Jasc Software.
- Corel Photo-Paint – A bitmap graphics program comparable to Adobe Photoshop, bundled with the CorelDRAW Graphics Suite.
- Corel SnapFire – A digital photo management suite, positioned to compete with Google's Picasa offering, later developed and marketed as Corel MediaOne.
- Corel Ventura – Desktop publishing software that had a large and loyal following for its MS-DOS version when Corel acquired it in the early 1990s. It was briefly revived in 2002.

== Acquired products ==
- Avid Studio – A video and audio editor specializing in production technology. Avid Studio was renamed Pinnacle Studio in September 2012.
- Bryce – Software for creating 3D landscapes. Sold in 2004 to DAZ Productions.
- ClearSlide – Sales Engagement Platform, Sales Enablement + Engagement.
- Click and Create – A game development tool created by Clickteam that was also sold as The Games Factory. Click and Create 2 was sold to IMSI who released it as Multimedia Fusion.
- AfterShot Pro – Photo management software, based on Bibble after the acquisition of Bibble Labs in 2012.
- Gravit Designer – A cross-platform vector graphics editor acquired in the takeover of Gravit GmbH in 2018.
- MindJet MindManager – In August 2016, Corel purchased Mindjet as per announcement.
- MotionStudio 3D – A 3D text and animation program originally called Ulead COOL 3D and was developed by Ulead Systems. It was rebranded after Corel acquired Ulead.
- PaintShop Pro – In October 2004, Corel purchased Jasc Software, developer of this budget-priced bitmap graphics editing program.
- Paradox – A relational database acquired from Borland and bundled with WordPerfect Office Professional Edition.
- Parallels – a range of virtualization products, sold as Parallels Desktop for Mac, Parallels Server for Mac, Parallels Workstation, and Parallels RAS. In February 2026, the Parallels software division was split from the rest of the business.
- Quattro Pro – A spreadsheet program acquired from Borland and bundled with WordPerfect Office.
- Reviversoft – An American computer optimizer software company acquired by Corel in 2014.
- Simplestar – An American computer optimizer software company.
- VideoStudio – A digital video editing program originally developed by Ulead Systems which remains a distribution of Ulead Systems. The software was rebranded Corel VideoStudio since Corel acquired Ulead and it became a working division of Corel.
- WinDVD – A video and music player software, acquired in 2006 from Corel's purchase of InterVideo.
- WinZip – File archiving and compression software acquired by Corel in 2006.
- WordPerfect – A word processing program acquired from Novell, and originally produced by WordPerfect Corporation.
- XMetaL – An XML editor acquired in the takeover of SoftQuad in 2001 and then sold to Blast Radius in 2004.

== Corel World Design Contest ==
The annual Corel World Design Contest first ran from 1990 through 1998. The competition intended to recognize and encourage an international community of graphic artists from over 50,000,000 registered Corel users. Two finalists for each of the eight categories were awarded a trip to Ottawa, Canada to participate in the Corel World Design Contest gala and awards ceremony. The finalists from each of the eight categories received an issue of the "Corel Crystal Award". The collection of artworks were later released in a catalogue with bundled CD, under the name of "Corel Artshow". The contest was reinitiated in 2009 on the 20th Anniversary of CorelDRAW's launch and now runs every two years. The 2013 and 2015 contests each had a prize pool with a total value of US$100,000.

Corel logo history
Logo for Corel's short-lived ProCreate brand

Corel's current logo

Corel's second logo

Corel's third logo, launched February 2001

== Arms ==
Coat of arms of Corel
Notes Granted 21 June 1996. Crest A demi lion rampant Gules holding with the dexter forepaw from its basket proper a hot air balloon tierced in fesse Azure, Or and Bleu-Celeste the sinister forepaw resting on a representation of the globe proper. Escutcheon Azure semé of stellar lights Or two flaunches barry wavy Or and Bleu-Celeste overall a bezant charged with seven squares Gules their angles conjoined inwards to form a polygonal "C". Motto Succeed While Having Fun

== See also ==
- Bridgeman Art Library v. Corel Corp.
