= DVD authoring =

Content publishing on digital video discs, DVDs

DVD authoring is the process of creating a DVD-Video disc capable of playing on a DVD player. DVD authoring software must conform to the specifications set by the DVD Forum.

DVD authoring is the second step in the process of producing finished DVDs. The first step is the creation of the movie (or programme) and the second, the authoring, is the creation of artwork, user menus, insertion of chapter points, overdubs/commentaries, setting autoplay and/or repeat options, etc. The final step is the manufacturing (replication) process to mass-produce finished DVDs (see optical disc authoring).

Strictly speaking, DVD authoring differs from the process of MPEG encoding, but as of 2009 most DVD authoring software has a built-in encoder, although separate encoders are still used when better quality or finer control over compression settings are required.

Most DVD-authoring applications focus exclusively on video DVDs and do not support the authoring of DVD-Audio discs.

Stand-alone DVD recorder units generally have basic authoring functions, though the creator of the DVD has little or no control over the layout of the DVD menus, which generally differ between models and brands.

== The DVD specification ==
To develop a DVD application (software or hardware), one must first license the particular book of DVD specifications from DVD Format/Logo Licensing Corporation. The different DVD formats have different books. Each book contains hundreds of pages and costs approximately $5000. After obtaining this license, the developer must become a licensee, which requires an additional fee. Without becoming a licensee, the book can be used only for reference, not for actual creation of DVD applications.

The DVD specifications were written in Japanese and then translated to other languages such as English. This process has resulted in text that can be difficult to interpret, and to this day, many companies interpret various parts of the specifications in different ways. This is the primary reason DVD players from different manufacturers do not always behave identically.

== Applications ==
Many different DVD authoring applications have been created. Many high-end authoring applications evolve in-house in companies such as Matsushita, Philips, Sony, and Toshiba. Such companies strictly forbid the sale of their systems outside each company: internal and DVD laboratories or movie studio partners use them to produce DVDs for customers.

Daikin, a large Japanese air conditioning and refrigeration contracting company, developed Scenarist, a high-end DVD authoring software package. Daikin has partnered with Sonic Solutions for development and marketing in the United States. The software was translated to English and has since become the standard for DVD production in Hollywood. Like the other high-end and very expensive systems, it conforms to the DVD specifications more closely than other software. In 2001, Sonic Solutions acquired the DVD authoring business, including ReelDVD and Scenarist, from Daikin and now sells Scenarist.

Sonic, a United States corporation, has a major share in the market for selling DVD-authoring tools. They previously manufactured computer based audio recording applications, but realized that at some point DVD recorders would become as widely available as CD recorders and that there was no affordable application for the home market or that DVD recorder makers could license as an OEM. At that time, all DVD authoring applications cost many thousands of dollars.

Sonic developed DVDit, an application that started selling below $500. It used only a small part of the whole DVD specification and presented it in a form that didn't require any knowledge of internal DVD structure. Later, this form became the building block of many other simplified consumer DVD applications. OEM licensing allowed Sonic to very soon become a major player. Sonic is now part of Rovi Corporation.

== See also ==
- DVD-Video
- List of DVD authoring applications
- Optical disc authoring
