= Barrett Lyon =

American businessman (born 1978)

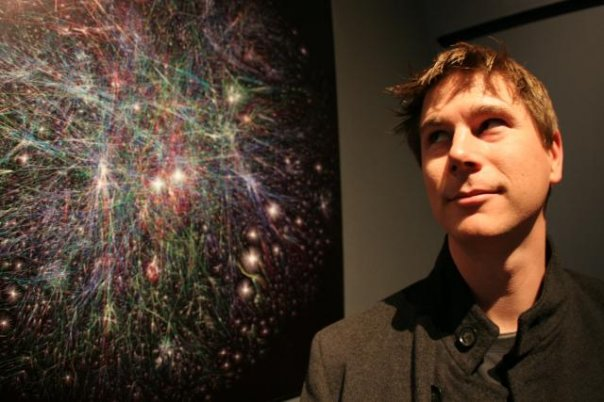
- Born: 18 March 1978 (age 48)
- Known for: Opte Project
- Scientific career
- Fields: Computer science
- Workplaces: Prolexic Technologies; BitGravity; Opte Project; XDN; Defense.Net

Barrett Gibson Lyon (born March 18, 1978) is an American Internet entrepreneur, security researcher, and a former hacker.

== Early life and education ==
The son of a lawyer, Lyon was raised in Auburn, California. Although he initially struggled in school due to dyslexia, in middle school he became fascinated with computers. He soon found that the methods he used to overcome dyslexia allowed him to quickly gain expert knowledge of computers. While in high school, he set up Linux servers to host webpages for friends and also managed his school's computer network. In 1995, while investigating a possible vulnerability in Network Solutions he accidentally caused AOL's website to go down for three days. After high school, Lyon enrolled at California State University, Sacramento, and studied philosophy and photography.

== Opte Project ==
Lyon is the creator of the Opte Project, which is an Internet mapping project that seeks to make an accurate representation of the extent of the Internet using visual graphics. The project was started in October 2003 in an effort to provide a useful Internet map with open-source code. The project has gathered support worldwide and is part of the catalogs of the Boston Museum of Science and The Museum of Modern Art.

== Prolexic ==
While working part-time in college for a small network security company, Lyon worked on defending websites against Denial of Service attacks. He soon decided to start Prolexic Technologies to specifically focus on defending websites against such attacks. His initial customers were online casinos which were facing extortionist threats from operators of Denial of Service attacks. After helping bring a Russian hacker to justice, Lyon's publicity allowed him to gain many new clients from outside of the gambling industry. He soon began giving talks about botnets and DoS attacks at industry meetings. Lyon eventually left Prolexic to start BitGravity. Prolexic was later sold to Akamai Technologies, a content delivery network based in Boston for $370 million.

== Netography ==
Lyon was the CEO of his startup Netography, until intrusion detection pioneer and creator of Snort, Martin Roesch was appointed in August 2022. Roesch as CEO and chair of the Board, Lyon as Chief Architect, and co-founder Dan Murphy as CTO, then raised $45M from Andreessen Horowitz and SYN Ventures. The company was later acquired by the cybersecurity company, Vectra AI in 2025.

== DoS investigation ==
Lyon has been called a hero for his work tracking Russian denial of service attack extortion groups. His work has been featured around the globe and is featured in the book Fatal System Error. He provided details and helped coordinate with multinational law enforcement groups which resulted in the capture of Ivan Maksakov, Alexander Petrov, and Denis Stepanov. The three men were at the heart of an extortion ring which was extorting money from banks, Internet casinos, and other web-based businesses. Reported damages caused by Maksakov, Petrov, and Stenanov range in the tens of millions of dollars. On October 8, 2007, Maksakov, Petrov, Stenanov were found guilty and sentenced to eight years in prison in the Russian Federation with a 100,000 ruble penalty. Lyon also appeared on NPR’s Fresh Air with Terry Gross.

== Business interests ==
After leaving Prolexic, Lyon co-founded of BitGravity, a content delivery network and served as its chief technology officer. BitGravity was founded to provide scaled video content to replace traditional TV. Its early customers included YouTube, ABC, NBC, CBS, and Fox. While at BitGravity, to lessen billing confusion regarding the definition of a gigabyte, Lyon defined an accepted billing amount, coined as the BarretByte.

Lyon left BitGravity in June 2009. BitGravity was acquired in January 2011 by Tata Communications.

In 2009 with funding from Jay Adelson and Kevin Rose, he founded XDN. XDN's first products provide businesses with greater control over existing content delivery networks by allowing them to use CDN's based on factors like price and service. In November 2012, XDN was acquired by Fortinet.

Lyon then founded Defense.Net in December 2012 to build a DDoS defense network for the modern Internet. In 2014, the company was named one of the 100 Hottest Private Companies in North America by Red Herring and acquired shortly after by F5 purportedly for between $50 and $100 million.

Lyon formerly worked as Head of Security Research and Development for US telecommunications firm, Neustar. He has operated a Laser Production company along with designing camping equipment for Alien Buffalo. Recently he announced a new venture Netography and currently serves as Chief Architect, with seed funding from Andreesson Horowitz and Mango Capital.

Lyon was an investor in Sr. Pago, which was acquired by Konfio in 2021. He is also a member of the International Academy of Digital Arts and Sciences (IADAS).

== See also ==
- Opte Project
- Fatal System Error
- Prolexic
- Denial of service attack
- MoMA
- Network mapping
- Defense.Net
