= Visio =

Visio may refer to:

- Dream vision or visio, a literary device

== Software-related ==
- Microsoft Visio, diagramming and vector graphics application
  - Visio Corporation, acquired by Microsoft, developer of Microsoft Visio
- "Visio" videoconferencing free-and-open-source software developed mainly by the French government as part of LaSuite

== See also ==
- Visio.M, an electric car research project at the Technical University of Munich
- Vizio, a consumer electronics company
