= ConceptDraw DIAGRAM =

Proprietary diagramming software

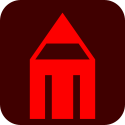
- Developer: Computer Systems Odessa
- Initial release: 1999; 27 years ago
- Stable release: 18 / October 8, 2024; 16 months ago
- Operating system: Microsoft Windows, macOS
- Type: Diagramming software
- License: Proprietary
- Website: www.conceptdraw.com/products/drawing-tool/

ConceptDraw DIAGRAM for macOS
- Operating system: macOS Sonoma; macOS Sequoia
- Website: www.conceptdraw.com/products/drawing-tool/

ConceptDraw DIAGRAM for Windows
- Operating system: Windows 10; Windows 11
- Website: www.conceptdraw.com/products/drawing-tool/

ConceptDraw DIAGRAM (previously known as ConceptDraw PRO) is proprietary diagramming software used to create business graphics, including: diagrams, flowcharts, Infographics, data visualization for business process models, data presentation and project management documentation. It can also be used for creating professional and technical diagrams, such as: UML diagrams, DFD, ERD, computer networks topology, engineering schemes, floor plans, and other technical graphic formats. The program was developed by CS Odessa in 1999. Since 2008, it has formed a part of ConceptDraw OFFICE. A set of solution add-ons that include collections of task-oriented templates and vector stencils libraries, have been released for ConceptDraw DIAGRAM, relating to certain industry-specific graphical tasks. Starting with version 11, DIAGRAM supports using the LaTeX typesetting system in formulas and text. The software also contains a set of tools for vector graphics drawing, along with a built-in presentation mode.

== File formats ==
- CDDZ - ConceptDraw DIAGRAM document
- CDD - ConceptDraw PRO v9 and earlier document
- CDTZ - ConceptDraw DIAGRAM template
- CDL - ConceptDraw DIAGRAM vector objects library
- CDSZ - ConceptDraw DIAGRAM Slide Show
- CDX - ConceptDraw XML

ConceptDraw DIAGRAM supports its own XML format, and an embedded Basic Script language for creating complex graphic objects, that change in visual appearance depending on external data received from personal files or from the Internet (Live Objects).

== Cross-Platform Compatibility ==
ConceptDraw DIAGRAM is cross-platform compatible when running on macOS and Windows operating systems: files created on a computer power by macOS can be opened and edited on a Windows computer, and vice versa. The Developer's end-user license agreement allows for cross-platform installation with a single license.

== Export/Import ==
It has import and export roundtrip of the MS Visio file format - can open and save formats that can be used by MS Visio documents (VSD, VDX, and VSDX) users. ConceptDraw DIAGRAM can import both generations of MS Visio stencils (VSS or VSSX) ConceptDraw DIAGRAM supports the round-trip import and export of the Microsoft Visio 2003 - 2016 file format that is used for MS Visio documents (VSD, VDX, and VSDX formats). ConceptDraw DIAGRAM can import both generations of MS Visio stencils (VSS or VSSX). It can export and import MS PowerPoint files and a variety of other graphic file formats. It can also export files to SVG, Adobe PDF and SWF. ConceptDraw DIAGRAM can import data from other ConceptDraw OFFICE applications, such as ConceptDraw MINDMAP and ConceptDraw PROJECT.

== See also ==
- MS Visio
- OmniGraffle
- SmartDraw
- Diagrams
- Flowchart
- Comparison of network diagram software
