= Network diagram software =

A number of tools exist to generate computer network diagrams. Broadly, there are four types of tools that help create network maps and diagrams:

- Hybrid tools
- Network Mapping tools
- Network Monitoring tools
- Drawing tools

Network mapping and drawing software support IT systems managers to understand the hardware and software services on a network and how they are interconnected. Network maps and diagrams are a component of network documentation. They are required artifacts to better manage IT systems' uptime, performance, security risks, plan network changes and upgrades.

== Hybrid tools ==
These tools have capabilities in common with drawing tools and network monitoring tools. They are more specialized than general drawing tools and provide network engineers and IT systems administrators a higher level of automation and the ability to develop more detailed network topologies and diagrams. Typical capabilities include but not limited to:

- Displaying port / interface information on connections between devices on the maps
- Visualizing VLANs / subnets
- Visualizing virtual servers and storage
- Visualizing flow of network traffic across devices and networks
- Displaying WAN and LAN maps by location
- Importing network configuration files to generate topologies automatically

Some infrastructure management platforms generate network topology diagrams from their asset databases rather than through live network discovery. These documentation-driven approaches reflect the network as it is recorded, keeping the diagram in sync as the documentation is updated. This is particularly useful for environments where network discovery is restricted or where the documented design must be maintained as the authoritative reference. Platforms such as Device42, Obelinf and netTerrain provide this capability as part of their broader infrastructure management feature set.

== Network mapping tools ==
These tools are specifically designed to generate automated network topology maps. These visual maps are automatically generated by scanning the network using network discovery protocols. Some of these tools integrate into documentation and monitoring tools. Typical capabilities include but not limited to:

- Automatically scanning the network using SNMP, SSH, WMI, etc.
- Scanning Windows and Unix servers
- Scanning virtual hosts
- Scanning routing protocols
- Performing scheduled scans
- Tracking changes to the network
- Notifying users of changes to the network

== Network monitoring tools ==
Some network monitoring tools generate visual maps by automatically scanning the network using network discovery protocols. The maps are ideally suited for viewing network monitoring status and issues visually. Typical capabilities include but not limited to:

- Automatically scanning the network using SNMP, WMI, etc.
- Scanning Windows and Unix servers
- Scanning virtual hosts
- Scanning routing protocols
- Scanning connection speeds
- Performing scheduled scans
- Tracking changes to the network

== Drawing tools ==
These tools help users to create network topology diagrams by adding icons to a canvas and using lines and connectors to draw linkages between nodes. This category of tools is similar to general drawing and paint tools. Typical capabilities include but not limited to:

- Libraries of icons for devices
- Ability to add shapes and annotations to maps
- Ability to create free-form diagrams

== List of network monitoring tools that generate network maps ==
Some notable tools (may not be an exhaustive list):

Name	License	Deployment	Platforms
OpenNMS	AGPLv3	Desktop	Linux, macOS, others
PRTG	Proprietary	Desktop	Windows
SolarWinds	Proprietary	Desktop	Windows
Spiceworks	Proprietary	Desktop	Windows

== List of drawing tools ==
Some notable tools (may not be an exhaustive list):

Name	License	Deployment	Platforms
Creately	Proprietary	SaaS	Linux, macOS, Windows
Cacoo (Software)	Proprietary	SaaS	Windows, macOS
ConceptDraw PRO	Proprietary	Desktop	Windows, macOS
Dia	GPL-2.0-or-later	Desktop	Linux, macOS, Unix, Windows
Microsoft Visio	Proprietary	Desktop	Windows
SmartDraw	Proprietary	Desktop	Windows
Lucidchart	Proprietary	SaaS	Linux, macOS, Windows
Gliffy	Proprietary	SaaS	Linux, macOS, Windows

== See also ==
- Computer network diagram
