= Active probing =

- Active probing, in countries with strict Internet censorship, is a way to detect VPN-like services by sending requests to suspected addresses/servers.
- Network mapping#Active probing
