= Defense.Net =

American I.T. company

Defense.Net, Inc
- Type: Privately held company
- Industry: Information Technology & Services
- Founded: 2012
- Headquarters: Belmont, California, USA
- Area served: Worldwide
- Website: www.defense.net

Defense.Net is a privately held American information technology and services company. The company's business is to protect Internet-facing infrastructures – such as e-commerce web sites – against all forms of Distributed Denial of Service (DDoS) attacks at the network. Defense.Net operates a constellation of DDoS mitigation sites around the Internet which are capable of filtering and removing DDoS attacks real-time.

== History ==
Defense.Net was founded by Barrett Lyon in 2012. Lyon was also the pioneer of the DDoS mitigation industry as the founder of Prolexic, which was the first DDoS mitigation company.

In 2014, the company was named one of the 100 Hottest Private Companies in North America by Red Herring and acquired shortly after by F5 Networks purportedly for between $50 and $100 million.

In 2014, Defense.Net was acquired by F5 Networks.

== Financial history ==
In 2012 Bessemer Venture Partners lead a Series A round of funding for a total of $9.5 million.

== See also ==
- Denial-of-service attack
