= Internet Mapping Project =

Collecting network paths

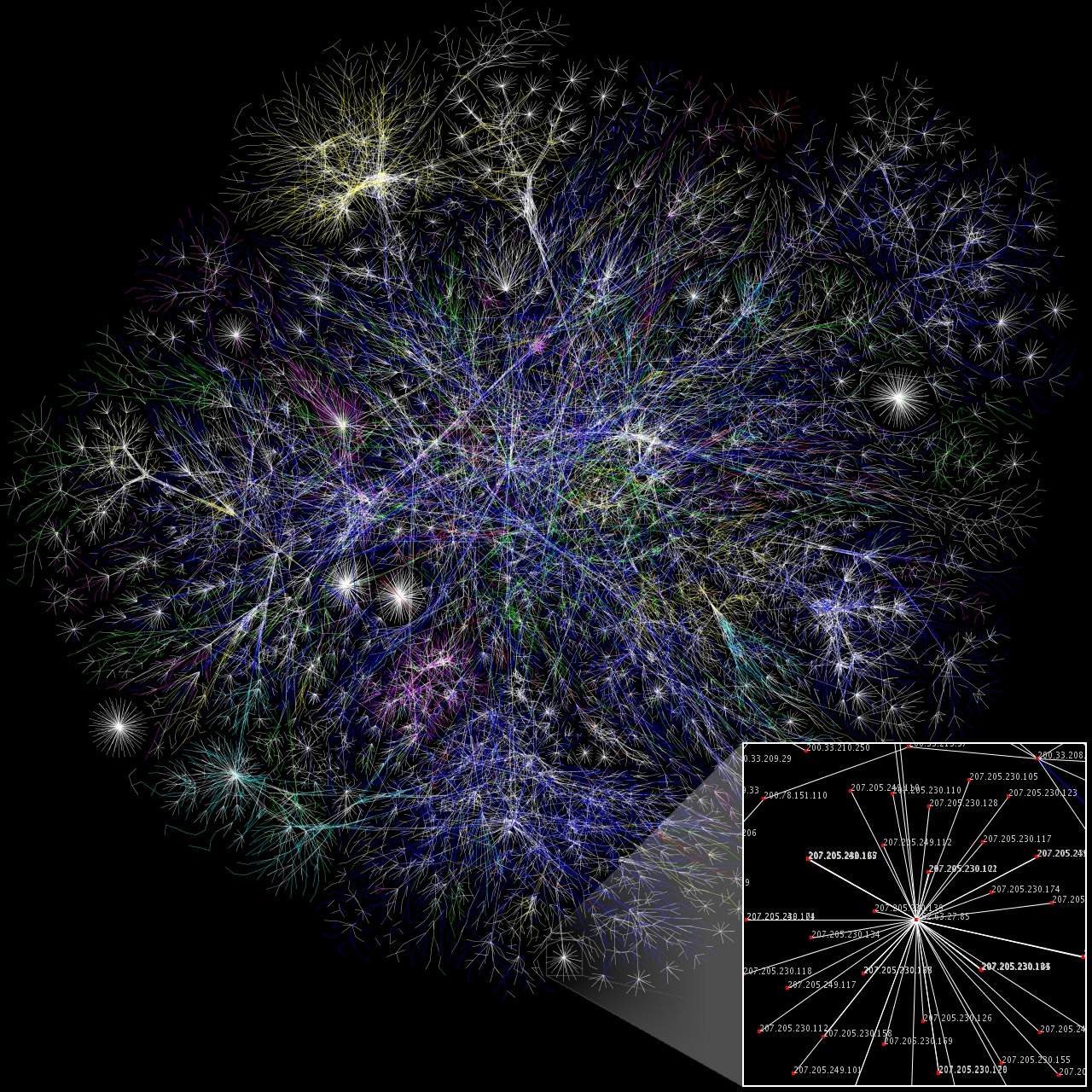
Internet Map from the Opte Project

The Internet Mapping Project was started by William Cheswick and Hal Burch at Bell Labs in 1997. It has collected and preserved traceroute-style paths to some hundreds of thousands of networks almost daily since 1998. The project included visualization of the Internet data, and the Internet maps were widely disseminated. Data collection for the project continued until 2011, and the raw traceroute-based database was archived and was then made available via BitTorrent. The resulting topology graphs were rendered using a force-directed (spring-force) layout algorithm where network nodes repelled one another while links acted as a spring, producing large-scale abstract visualizations of internet connectivity.

The technology is now used by Lumeta, a spinoff of Bell Labs, to map corporate and government networks. Although Cheswick left Lumeta in September 2006, Lumeta continues to map both the IPv4 and IPv6 Internet. The data allows for both a snapshot and view over time of the routed infrastructure of a particular geographical area, company, organization, etc. Cheswick continues to collect and preserve the data, and it is available for research purposes. According to Cheswick, a main goal of the project was to collect the data over time, and make a time-lapse movie of the growth of the Internet.

== Techniques ==
The techniques available for network discovery rely on hop-limited probes of the type used by the Unix traceroute utility or the Windows NT tracert.exe tool. A Traceroute-style network probe follows the path that network packets take from a source node to a destination node. This technique uses Internet Protocol packets with an 8-bit time to live (TTL) header field. As a packet passes through routers on the Internet, each router decreases the TTL value by one until it reaches zero. When a router receives a packet with a TTL value of zero, it drops the packet instead of forwarding it. At this point, it sends an Internet Control Message Protocol (ICMP) error message to the source node where the packet originated indicating that the packet exceeded its maximum transit time. Traceroute mapping techniques can be limited in their accuracy due to routers and firewalls blocking or putting a limit on ICMP replies. These limitations may lead to an incomplete view of network structure and can make it more difficult to build an accurate map of internet connectivity.

Active Probing – Active probing is a series of probes set out through a network to obtain data. Active probing is used in internet mapping to discover the topology of the Internet. Topology maps of the Internet are an important tool for characterizing the infrastructure and understanding the properties, behavior and evolution of the Internet. However, traceroute based mapping techniques may produce results that are incomplete or inaccurate due to firewall filtering, dynamic routing changes, and hidden network nodes. Additionally, large-scale mapping efforts may cause an increase in privacy and security concerns. Researchers have also used Internet Topology maps to study network security issues like Distributed Denial-of-Service attacks (DDoS).

== Other internet mapping projects ==
- Hand Drawn Maps of Internet from 1973.
- The Center for Applied Internet Data Analysis (CAIDA) collects, monitors, analyzes, and maps several forms of Internet traffic data concerning network topology. Their "Internet Topology Maps also referred to as AS-level Internet Graphs [are being generated] in order to visualize the shifting topology of the Internet over time."
- The Opte Project, started in 2003 by engineer Barrett Lyon, using traceroute and BGP routes for mapping.
- New Hampshire Project – In 2010, the U.S. Department of Commerce has awarded the University of New Hampshire's Geographically Referenced Analysis and Information Transfer (NH GRANIT) project approximately $1.7 million to manage a program that will inventory and map current and planned broadband coverage available to the state's businesses, educators, and citizens. As a part of this project, The New Hampshire Broadband Mapping Program (NHBMP) was created as a coordinated, multi-agency initiative funded by the American Recovery and Reinvestment Act through the National Telecommunications and Information Administration (NTIA), and is part of a national effort to expand high-speed Internet access and adoption through improved data collection and broadband planning.
- In 2009, Kevin Kelly (editor), cofounder of Wired Magazine, started his own Internet Mapping Project to understand how people conceive the internet. He wanted to discover the maps that people have in their mind as they navigate the vast internet by having them submit hand drawn pictures. So far, he has collected close to 80 submissions by people of all ages, nationalities and expertise levels, ranging from the concrete to the conceptual to the comic.

== See also ==
- Network mapping
- Route analytics
- Topology of the World Wide Web
- Distributed-denial-of-service
