= Fatal error =

Fatal error may refer to

- Fatal exception error, an unrecoverable error that forces a process to terminate abnormally and return control to the operating system
- Fatal system error, an unrecoverable error of the operating system that requires a restart
- Fatal Error, a 1999 film about a computer virus that evolves into a biological virus
- Fatal System Error (book), a nonfiction account of a cybercrime investigation
