= Prolexic Technologies =

Prolexic Technologies, now part of Akamai
- Type: Subsidiary
- Industry: Information technology and services
- Founded: 2003
- Headquarters: Hollywood, Florida, USA
- Area served: Worldwide
- Parent: Akamai Technologies
- Website: www.prolexic.com

Prolexic Technologies was a US-based provider of security solutions for protecting websites, data centers, and enterprise IP applications from Distributed Denial of Service (DDoS) attacks at the network, transport, and application layers. It operated a DDoS mitigation platform and a global network of traffic scrubbing centers. Real-time monitoring and mitigation services were provided by a 24/7 security operations control center (SOCC). Prolexic indicated its DDoS mitigation services make websites, data centers and enterprise IP applications harder to take down via DDoS attacks.

In February 2014, cybersecurity and cloud services company Akamai Technologies acquired Prolexic Technologies.

== History ==
In 2003 Prolexic Technologies (originally named DigiDefense) was founded by Barrett Lyon and was the subject of the book Fatal System Error by Joseph Menn. Prolexic protects organizations in the following markets: airlines/hospitality, e-commerce, energy, financial services, gambling, gaming, public sector, and software as a service. Sony is said to be a customer of the company. Prolexic claims some of the largest banks as its clients.

In 2005, the company was named one of the 100 Hottest Private Companies in North America by Red Herring.

Prolexic was acquired by Internet content delivery network Akamai Technologies in a $370 million deal completed in February 2014. In 2023, Akamai launched the sixth-generation Prolexic DDoS platform, a fully software-defined, scalable infrastructure that doubled its dedicated attack mitigation capacity to 20 Tbps.

== Financial history ==
In 2011, Prolexic completed two financing rounds led by Kennet Partners totaling $15.9 million.

In 2012 Baltimore private equity firm Camden Partners invested $6 million in the company, and American Trading and Production Corp invested $2 million as part of an $8 million Series B funding round. In the deal, Jason Tagler of Camden Partners joined the board of directors of Prolexic. Prolexic said it would use the Series B money to support staff and augment its network.

In 2013, Prolexic closed a US$30 million Series C funding round led by new investors Trident Capital and Intel Capital. Kennet Partners, Camden Partners and Medina Capital all took part in the funding round.

== DDoS mitigation ==
In 2012, hacktivism and vandalism were cited as the main inspiration for DDoS attacks, rather than extortion as in the past. This type of motivation is said to make any company a victim, not just high-profile organizations. Organizations of all sizes are said to be at risk of DDoS attacks, because the newer application-level attacks are more targeted than classic DDoS botnet attacks and don’t need as many resources to deploy. The cloud-based DDoS mitigation approach used by Prolexic employs technology to redirect traffic to the company’s DDoS mitigation service, scrub the traffic, and send only legitimate traffic to the client site. This attack mitigation approach is said to be lower-cost than the traditional approach of a company maintaining its own network firewall, making DDoS attack prevention an option for most firms doing business on the web.

== See also ==
- Denial-of-service attack
- Barrett Lyon
- Fatal System Error
