= ConceptDraw Project =

ConceptDraw PROJECT
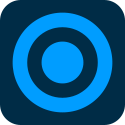
- Developer: Computer Systems Odessa
- Initial release: 2003; 23 years ago
- Stable release: 15 / October 8, 2024; 18 months ago
- Operating system: Microsoft Windows, macOS
- Type: Project management software
- License: Proprietary
- Website: ConceptDraw PROJECT

ConceptDraw PROJECT for macOS
- Operating system: macOS Sonoma; macOS Sequoia
- Website: www.conceptdraw.com/products/project-management-software/

ConceptDraw PROJECT for Windows
- Operating system: Windows 10; Windows 11
- Website: www.conceptdraw.com/products/project-management-software/

ConceptDraw PROJECT is a project management software package developed by Computer Systems Odessa for Microsoft Windows and macOS platforms. It presents projects as Gantt charts with linked tasks, milestones and deadlines. Since 2008 it has been a part of the ConceptDraw Office software package, and can thus represent Gantt charts as mind maps and vice versa. It can also produce visual reports, work breakdown structures and other project diagrams via ConceptDraw DIAGRAM. ConceptDraw PROJECT supports import and export of text outlines, MS Project, MS Excel, and MindManager files.

== Supported file formats ==
- CDPZ - ConceptDraw PROJECT document
- CDPX - ConceptDraw PROJECT XML
- CDPTZ - ConceptDraw PROJECT template
- CDMZ - ConceptDraw MINDMAP document
- MMAP - MindJet MindManager document
- MPP - Microsoft Project document
- XML – Microsoft Project XML document
- XLSX - Microsoft Office Excel Worksheet

== Cross-Platform Compatibility ==
ConceptDraw PROJECT is cross-platform compatible when running on macOS and Windows operating systems: files created on a computer power by macOS can be opened and edited on a Windows computer, and vice versa. The Developer's end-user license agreement allows for cross-platform installation with a single license. ConceptDraw PROJECT is compatible with Microsoft Office. It supports the import/export of MS Project files and MS Excel files.

== See also ==
- MS Project
- OmniPlan
- OpenProj
