= Firewalls and Internet Security =

1994 book by William R. Cheswick and Steven M. Bellovin

- Author: William Cheswick; Steven M. Bellovin
- Genre: Information Security
- Publisher: O'Reilly Media
- Publication date: 1994
- ISBN: 020163466X

Firewalls and Internet Security: Repelling the Wily Hacker is a 1994 book by William R. Cheswick and Steven M. Bellovin that helped define the concept of a network firewall. Describing in detail one of the first major firewall deployments at AT&T, the book influenced the formation of the perimeter security model, which became the dominant network security architecture in the mid-1990s.

In 2003, a second edition was published, adding Aviel D. Rubin to its authors.
