= William Cheswick =

American engineer

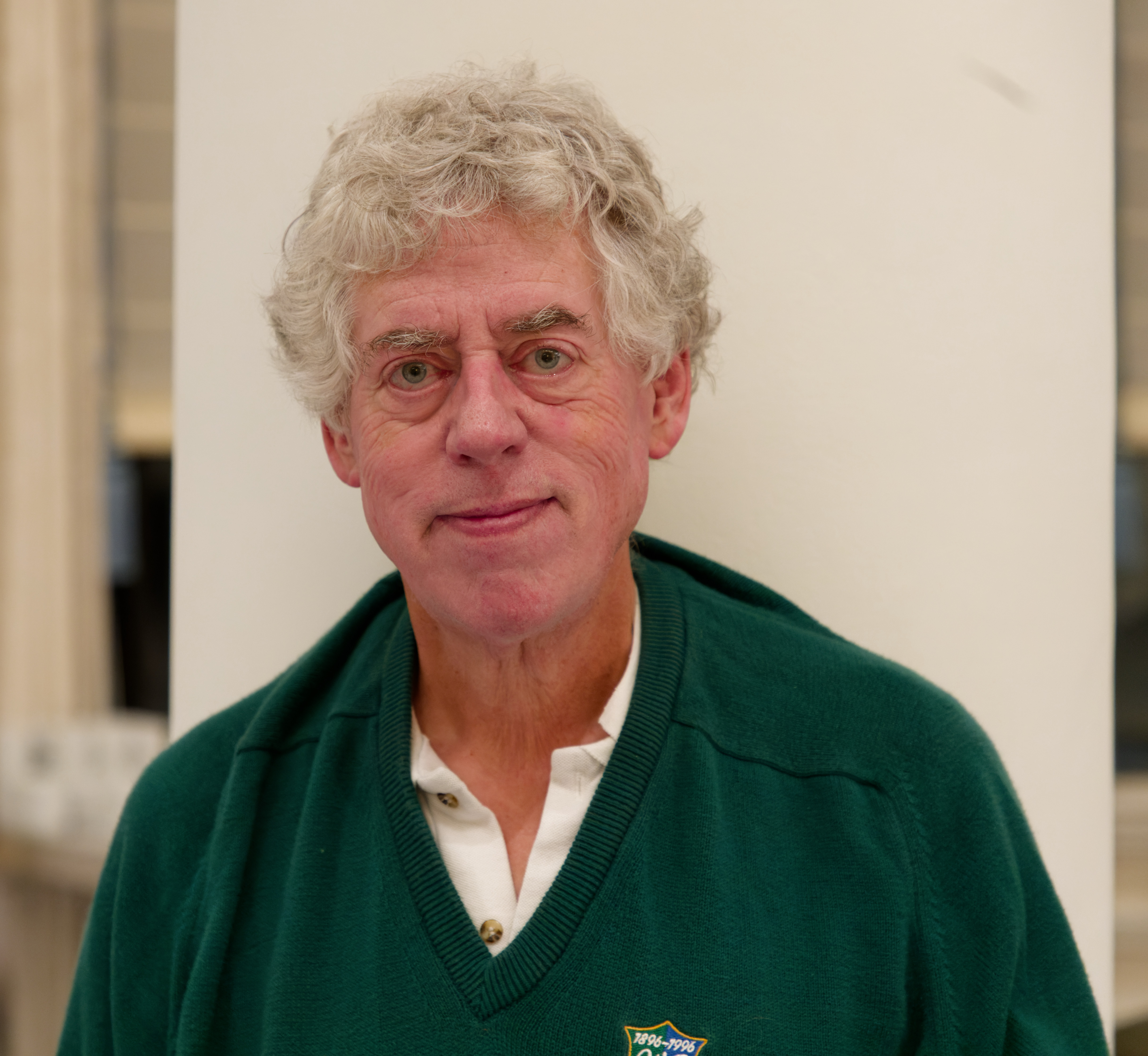
- Cheswick in 2024
- Born: William R. "Bill" Cheswick
- Other name: Ches
- Education: Graduated from Lawrenceville School; B.S. in Fundamental Science from Lehigh University

William R. "Bill" Cheswick (also known as "Ches") is a computer security and networking researcher.

== Education ==
Cheswick graduated from Lawrenceville School in 1970 and received a B.S. in Fundamental Science in 1975 from Lehigh University. While at Lehigh, working with Doug Price and Steve Lidie, Cheswick co-authored the Senator line-oriented text editor.

== Career ==
Cheswick's early career included contracting in Bethlehem, PA between 1975 and 1977. He was a Programmer for American Newspaper Publishers Association / Research Institute in Easton, PA between 1976 and 1977 and a Systems Programmer for Computer Sciences Corporation in Warminster, PA between 1977 and 1978. Following this, Cheswick joined Systems and Computer Technology Corporation where he served as a Systems Programmer and Consultant between 1978 and 1987. Much of Cheswick's early career was related to his expertise with Control Data Corporation (CDC) mainframes, their operating systems such as SCOPE and NOS, and the related COMPASS assembly language. Cheswick initially worked with CDC systems as a student at Lehigh University.

Cheswick joined Bell Labs in 1987. Shortly thereafter, he and Steven M. Bellovin created one of the world's first network firewalls. The resulting research and papers lead to their publication of the seminal book Firewalls and Internet Security, one of the first to describe the architecture of a firewall in detail. Cheswick and Bellovin also created one of the world's first honeypots in the course of detecting and trapping an attempted intruder into their network.

In 1998, Cheswick, still at Bell Labs (by then controlled by Lucent) started the Internet Mapping Project, assisted by Hal Burch. The research allowed large scale mapping of the internet for the first time, using tracerouting techniques to learn the connectivity graph of global networks. The work ultimately led to the founding in 2000 of a spinoff company, Lumeta, where Cheswick was a co-founder and held the title of Chief Scientist.

He joined AT&T Shannon Lab in 2007, where he remained until 2012.

== Hobbies, interests, and personal projects ==
Cheswick currently lives in New Jersey with his wife. He has two children. His home is a farmhouse in Flemington, New Jersey, which is an electronic smart house, equipped with a voice synthesizer that reports relevant information, from mailbox status to evening stock news. Cheswick has developed a few interactive exhibits for science museums, including the Liberty Science Center in New Jersey. Cheswick also enjoys model rocketry, and lock picking (both electronic and physical). He is interested in developing better passwords as discussed in his article "Rethinking Passwords" (Communications of the ACM 56.2 (2013)). Cheswick has also been seeking permission from filmmakers to publish his visualizations of their movies.
