= Opte Project =

Representation of the breadth of the Internet using visual graphics

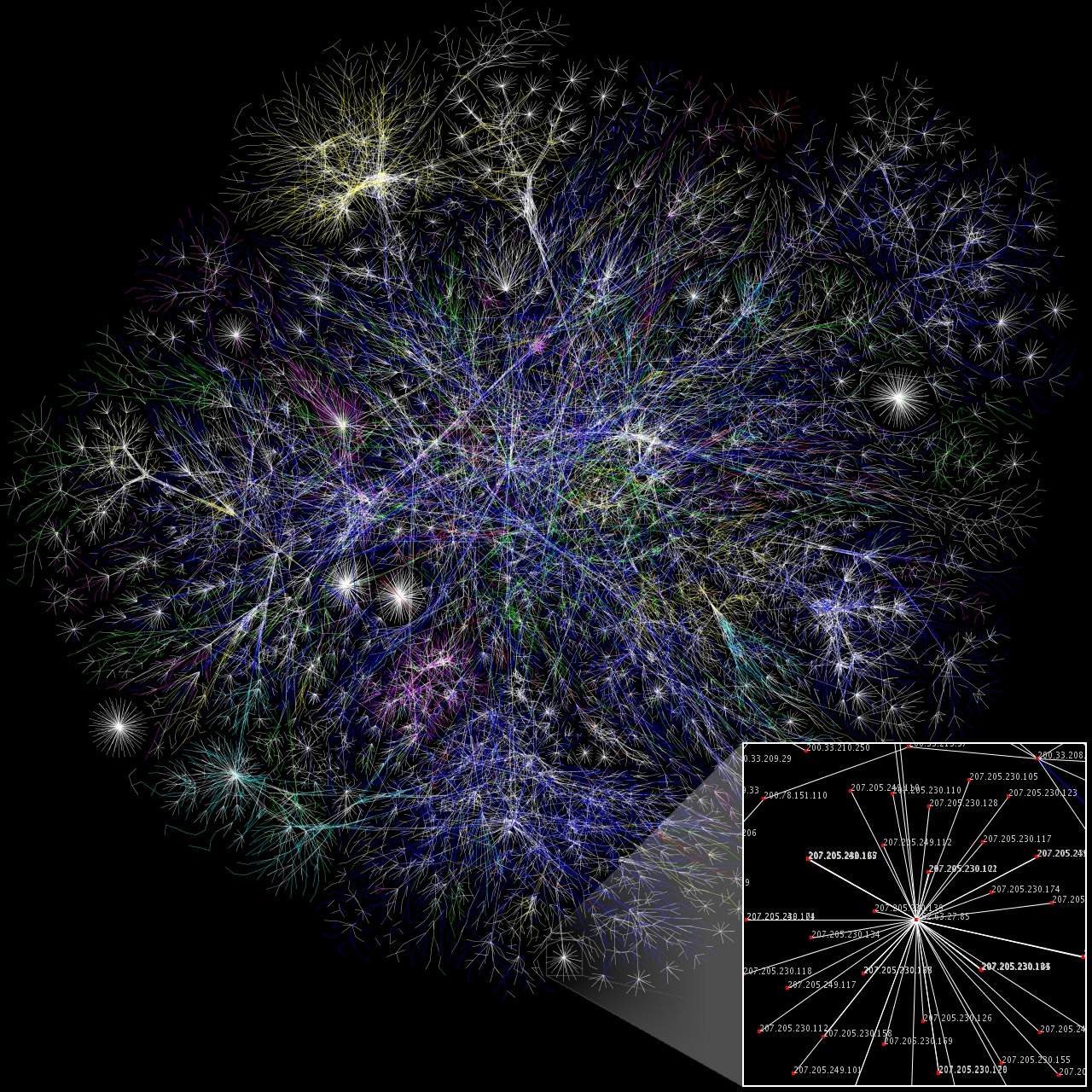
Visualization from the Opte Project of the various routes through a portion of the Internet in 2005

The Opte Project, created in 2003 by Barrett Lyon, seeks to generate an accurate representation of the breadth of the Internet using visual graphics. Lyon believes that his network mapping can help teach students more about the Internet while also acting as a gauge illustrating both overall Internet growth and the specific areas where that growth occurs. It was not the first such project; others predated it, such as the Bell Labs Internet Mapping Project.

Lyon has been generating image maps using traceroute, and later switched to mapping using BGP routes. The generated images were published on the Opte Project website. In 2021, Lyon created different video animations, using his mapping technique: shedding light on internet growth between 1997 and 2021, the Iranian internet shutdown of 2019, the United States Department of Defense's place on the internet as well as the few entry points into the Chinese internet.

The project has gathered notice worldwide having been featured by Time, Cornell University, New Scientist, and Kaspersky Lab. In addition, Opte Project maps have found homes in at least two art galleries and exhibits such as The Museum of Modern Art and the Museum of Science's Mapping the World Around Us permanent exhibit.

Opte images are licensed under a Creative Commons license and while use of The Opte Image is free for all non-commercial applications, a license fee is required for all others.
