= Technical documentation =

Description of a technical product

Technical documentation is a generic term for the classes of information created to describe (in technical language) the use, functionality, or architecture of a product, system, or service.

== Classes of technical documentation ==
Classes of technical documentation may include:

- patents
- specifications of item or of components/materials
- data sheets of item or of components/materials
- test methods
- manufacturing standards
- system requirements
- system architecture
- system design documents and data including those necessary for the system development, testing, manufacturing, operation and maintenance

== Standardizing technical documentation ==
Historically, most classes of technical documentation lacked universal conformity (standards) for format, content and structure. Standards are being developed to redress this through bodies such as the International Organization for Standardization(ISO), which has published standards relating to rules for preparation of user guides, manuals, product specifications, etc. for technical product documentation. These standards are covered by ICS 01.110. Technical product documentation not covered by ICS 01.110 are listed in the subsection below.

=== Discipline-specific ===
- ISO 15787
- ISO 3098
- ISO 10209
- ISO 2162
- ISO 5457
- ISO 6433

=== EU Medical Device Regulation ===
A technical documentation is also required for medical devices following EU medical device regulation. Annex II, Technical documentation, and Annex III, Technical documentation on post-market surveillance, of the regulation describe the content of a technical documentation for a medical device. This includes e.g. information on the device specification, labelling and instructions, design and manufacture, safety and performance requirements, risk management, and the validatain and verfification of the device, including the clinical evaluation; and also information from postmarketing surveillance.

=== Formats for source data ===
- Darwin Information Typing Architecture (DITA)
- DocBook
- S1000D
- reStructuredText

=== Documentation architecture and typing ===
Some documentation systems are concerned with the overall types or forms of documentation that constitute a documentation set, as well as (or rather than) how the documentation is produced, published or formatted.

For example, the Diátaxis framework (which is mostly used in the field of software documentation) posits four distinct documentation forms, corresponding to four different user needs: tutorials, how-to guides, reference and explanation. By contrast, DITA asserts five different "topic types": Task, Concept, Reference, Glossary Entry, and Troubleshooting, while RedHat's Modular Documentation system uses three "modules": Concept, Procedure and Reference.

== See also ==
- Document management system
- Method engineering
- Network documentation
- Technical communication
- Technical editing
- Technical file
- Technical standard
