= Category management =

Concept in retailing

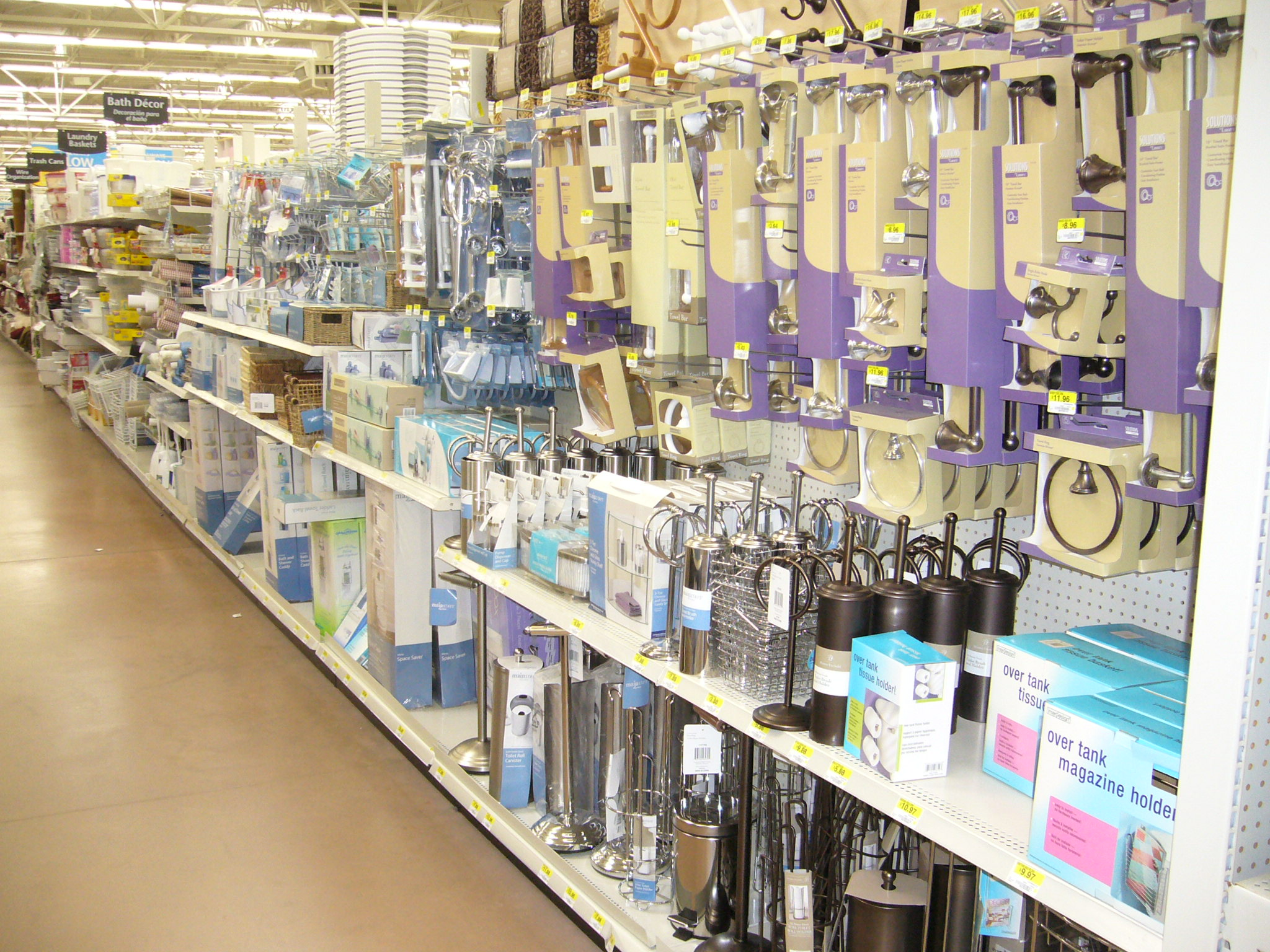
Bathroom fittings category in Walmart

Category management is a retailing and purchasing concept in which the range of products purchased by a business organization or sold by a retailer is broken down into discrete groups of similar or related products. These groups are known as product categories (examples of grocery categories might be: tinned fish, washing detergent, toothpastes). It is a systematic, disciplined approach to managing a product category as a strategic business unit. The phrase "category management" was coined by Brian F. Harris.

== Category management in a retail context ==
Each category is run as a "mini business" (business unit) in its own right, with its own set of turnover and/or profitability targets and strategies. Introduction of Category Management in a business tends to alter the relationship between retailer and supplier: instead of the traditional adversarial relationship, the relationship moves to one of collaboration, with exchange of information, sharing of data and joint business building.

The focus of all supplier negotiations is the effect on the turnover of the category as a whole, not just the sales of individual products. Suppliers are expected, and in many cases mandated, to only suggest new product introductions, a new planogram, or promotional activity if it is expected to have a beneficial effect on the turnover or profit of the total category and be beneficial to the shoppers of that category.

The concept originated in grocery (mass merchandising) retailing, and has since expanded to other retail sectors such as DIY, cash and carry, pharmacy, and book retailing.

== Definitions ==
The notion of responsibility category seeks to determine whether a business is fulfilling not only its economic responsibilities, but also its legal, ethical, and discretionary responsibilities. Category management lacks a single definition thus leading to some ambiguity even among industry professionals as to its exact function. Three comparable mainstream definitions are as follows:

- "a process that involves managing product categories as business units and customizing them [on a store by store basis] to satisfy customer needs" (Nielsen).
- "the strategic management of product groups through trade partnerships which aims to maximize sales and profit by satisfying consumer and shopper needs" (the UK-based Institute of Grocery Distribution).
- ".. a marketing strategy in which a full line of products (instead of the individual products or brands) is managed as a strategic business unit (SBU)" (Business Dictionary).

The Nielsen definition, published in 1992, was prescient for its time in that customizing product offerings on a store by store basis is logistically difficult and is now not considered a necessary part of category management; it is a concept now referred to as micromarketing. Nevertheless, most grocery retailers will segment stores at least by size, and select product assortments accordingly. Walmart's Store of the Community, implemented in North America, is one of the few examples of where product offerings are tailored right down to the specific store.

== Rationale for category management ==
One key reason for the introduction of category management was the retailers' desire for suppliers to add value to their (i.e. the retailer's) business rather than just the supplier's own. For example, in a category containing brands A and B, the situation could arise such that every time brand A promoted its products, the sales of brand B would go down by the amount that brand A would increase, resulting in no net gain for the retailer. The introduction of category management imposed the condition that all actions undertaken, such as new promotions, new products, re-vamped planogram / schematics, shopper and consumer insights, and the introduction of point of sale advertising etc., should be beneficial to the retailer and the shopper in the store.

A second reason was the realization that only a finite amount of profit could be achieved from price negotiations, and that there was more profit to be made by increasing the total level of sales.

A third reason was that collaboration with the supplier meant that the supplier’s expertise about the market could be drawn upon, and that a considerable amount of the workload involved in developing the category could also be delegated to the supplier.

== Definition of a category ==
The Nielsen definition of a 'category', used as the basic definition across the industry, is that the products should meet a similar consumer need, or that the products should be inter-related or substitutable. The Nielsen definition also includes a provision that products placed together in the same category should be logistically manageable in store (for example there may be issues in having room-temperature and chilled products together in the same category even though the initial two conditions are met).

However, this definition does not explain how the process often works in practical retailing situations, where demographic or marketing considerations take precedence.

The next step in category management is to understand the mechanism of the customer's decision concerning purchases of a given category. The decision-making process is usually analyzed by observing customers directly in the store and by direct surveying. The result is recorded in the Customer Decision Tree (CDT)

== The category management 8-step process (retail) ==
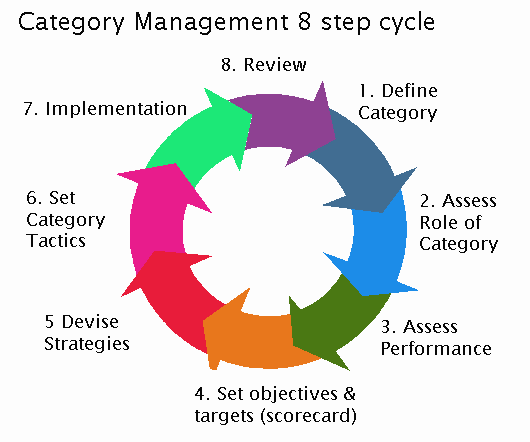
The category management 8-step process

The industry standard model for category management in retail is the 8-step process, or 8-step cycle developed by the Partnering Group. The eight steps are shown in the adjacent diagram; they are :

1. Define the category (i.e. what products are included/excluded).
2. Define the role of the category within the retailer.
3. Assess the current performance.
4. Set objectives and targets for the category.
5. Devise an overall strategy.
6. Devise specific tactics.
7. Implementation.
8. The eighth step is a review, returning the process to step one.

The 8-step process, whilst being very comprehensive and thorough has been criticized for being rather too unwieldy and time-consuming in today's fast-moving sales environment; in one survey only 9% of supplier companies stated they used the full 8-step process. The current industry trend is for supplier companies to use the standard process as a basis to develop their own more streamlined processes, tailored to their own particular products

Market research company Nielsen has a similar process based on only 5 steps : reviewing the category, targeting consumers, planning merchandising, implementing strategy, evaluating results.

Modern category management is often supported by cloud-based software solutions that use artificial intelligence and sales analytics to optimize assortments, perform store clustering, and track category performance. One example of such a platform is Leafio AI, which assists category managers in data-driven assortment planning and optimization.

== Category captains ==
A supplier in a category is often nominated by the retailer as a category captain. The category captain will be expected to have the closest and most regular contact with the retailer and will also be expected to invest time, effort, and often financial assets into the strategic development of the category within the retailer. In return, the supplier will gain a more influential voice with the retailer. The category captain is often the supplier with the largest turnover in the category. Traditionally the job of category captain is given to a brand supplier, but in recent times the role has also gone to private label suppliers.
In order to do the job effectively, the supplier may be granted access to a greater wealth of data-sharing, e.g. more access to an internal sales database such as Walmart's Retail Link.

In the UK, the Groceries Code Adjudicator found in her 2015-16 investigation into Tesco plc that some suppliers paid "large sums of money in exchange for category captaincy or participation in a range review". She found some evidence of benefits which suppliers derive from these arrangements but also recorded a concern, to be investigated further, as to whether the purpose of the Groceries Code was being circumvented by these payments.

== Governmental concerns about category management ==
Many governments have viewed increased collaboration between suppliers and retailers as a potential source of antitrust breaches, such as price fixing. For example, the UK Competition Commission has raised their issues on market distortion in principle. They have also acted on milk price-fixing in Britain.

== Modified category management ==
For MRP-based manufacturing industries, the predominant cost-saving methodology in category management (CM) involves the integration of market intelligence with leveraged spending (for a given category of product or service). In industries where asset operation and preservation bear more significance to the procurement process than do product manufacturing – such as in an MRO environment – demonstrable benefit can still be achieved with category management but is best approached with some manner of adjustment to CM's usual processes for analysis and strategy development. The first challenge becomes incorporating analytical processes and value drivers that are largely indigenous to the MRP world in a manner that makes sense to an MRO environment. The second (and no less important) challenge becomes avoiding a trap where the CM processes are perceived to be more important than their outcome – a scenario that can result in significant analytical delay, and even complete process paralysis. An excellent example of an MRO environment warranting adjustment to classical category management is nuclear power generation in the United States, where the adjusted approach to category management has been coined "MCM" – standing for MRO-based Category Management or Modified Category Management. Not only does electricity generation epitomize an MRO-driven environment, the nuclear energy source adds numerous dimensions of supply and procurement complexity – including federal and state regulatory compliance, nuclear industry standards compliance, nuclear-unique system and component design, and a tightly audited (and very small) supply base, amongst others. Due to the nature and quantity of discrete characteristics native to nuclear power generation, it can easily be argued that nuclear power generation, in and of itself, should be a distinct category of procurement within a category management project. The fundamental adjustment made between the classical category management approach and the nuclear MCM approach is a shift from procurement strategies focused on leveraged spending to procurement strategies embracing nuclear value drivers, technology innovation, risk management, and strategic sourcing.

== See also ==
- Fast-moving consumer goods
- Retailing
- Shopper marketing
- Planogram
- Supplier Relationship Management
