= ConceptDraw Office =

Proprietary office software suite

ConceptDraw OFFICE
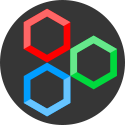
- Developer(s): Computer Systems Odessa LLC
- Initial release: June 17, 2008; 16 years ago
- Stable release: 11 / 8 October 2024
- Operating system: Microsoft Windows, macOS
- License: Proprietary
- Website: ConceptDraw OFFICE

ConceptDraw OFFICE is a proprietary office software suite of business productivity tools, developed by Computer Systems Odessa for use with either Microsoft Windows and macOS operating systems. ConceptDraw OFFICE is composed of mind mapping, project management and business diagramming tools. The three components use the cross-format exchange technology, allowing users to employ a visual approach to information management whereby the same set of data can be shown as a mind map, Gantt chart, or business graphic design.

== Components ==
- ConceptDraw MINDMAP - Mind mapping and brainstorming tool. Developed for Microsoft Windows and macOS.
- ConceptDraw PROJECT - Project management package. Developed for Microsoft Windows and macOS.
- ConceptDraw DIAGRAM (previously known as ConceptDraw PRO) - Diagramming and vector graphics software. Developed for Microsoft Windows and macOS.
- ConceptDraw Solutions - An online collection of add-ons, samples, and templates designed to solve specific professional tasks in education, project management, writing, business process modeling, software development, or engineering, among others. The suite uses its own proprietary set of file formats.

== Versions ==
| Version | Content | Release date | Operational Systems Supported | Support |
|---|---|---|---|---|
| ConceptDraw Office 1.x | ConceptDraw MINDMAP 6.x ConceptDraw PROJECT 5.x ConceptDraw PRO 8.x | June 17, 2008 | | Not supported since December 2010 |
| ConceptDraw Office 2.x | ConceptDraw MINDMAP 7.x ConceptDraw PROJECT 6.x ConceptDraw PRO 9.x | December 14, 2010 | Microsoft Windows 7,8 (32-bit & 64 bit certified); Mac OS X 10.7,10.8,10.9 | Not supported since November 2014. Upgrade to the current version is available. |
| ConceptDraw Office 3.x | ConceptDraw MINDMAP 8.x ConceptDraw PROJECT 7.x ConceptDraw PRO 10.x | November 12, 2014 | Microsoft Windows 7/8.1/10 (32-bit & 64-bit certified) macOS 10.10 and 10.11 | Not supported since January 17, 2017. Upgrade to the current version is available. |
| ConceptDraw Office 4.x | ConceptDraw MINDMAP 9.x ConceptDraw PROJECT 8.x ConceptDraw PRO 11.x | January 17, 2017 | Microsoft Windows 7/8.1/10 (32-bit & 64-bit certified) macOS 10.12.0 through 10.12.5 only / 10.13.0 through 10.13.5 only | Not supported since August 21, 2018. Upgrade to the current version is available. |
| ConceptDraw Office 5 | ConceptDraw MINDMAP 10; ConceptDraw PROJECT 9 ConceptDraw DIAGRAM 12 | August 21, 2018 | Microsoft Windows 7/8.1/10 (64-bit certified) macOS 10.13 and 10.14 | Not supported since October 8, 2019. Upgrade to the current version is available. |
| ConceptDraw Office 6 | ConceptDraw MINDMAP 11; ConceptDraw PROJECT 10 ConceptDraw DIAGRAM 13 | October 8, 2019 | Microsoft Windows 7 SP1/8.1/10 (64-bit certified) macOS 10.13, 10.14 and 10.15 | Not supported since October 7, 2020. Upgrade to the current version is available. |
| ConceptDraw Office 7 | ConceptDraw MINDMAP 12; ConceptDraw PROJECT 11 ConceptDraw DIAGRAM 14 | October 7, 2020 | Microsoft Windows 7 SP1/8.1/10 (64-bit certified) macOS 10.14 and 10.15 | Not supported since November 16, 2021. Upgrade to the current version is available. |
| ConceptDraw Office 8 | ConceptDraw MINDMAP 13; ConceptDraw PROJECT 12 ConceptDraw DIAGRAM 15 | November 16, 2021 | Microsoft Windows 8.1, 10 (64-bit certified) macOS 10.15 (Catalina), 11 (Big Sur), and 12 (Monterey) | Not supported since October 20, 2022. Upgrade to the current version is available. |
| ConceptDraw Office 9 | ConceptDraw MINDMAP 14; ConceptDraw PROJECT 13 ConceptDraw DIAGRAM 16 | October 20, 2022 | Microsoft Windows 8.1, 10 (64-bit certified) macOS 11 (Big Sur), 12 (Monterey), 13 (Ventura) | Not supported since October 24, 2023. An upgrade to the current version is available. |
| ConceptDraw Office 10 | ConceptDraw MINDMAP 15; ConceptDraw PROJECT 14 ConceptDraw DIAGRAM 17 | October 24, 2023 | Microsoft Windows 8.1, 10 (64-bit certified) macOS 12 (Monterey), 13 (Ventura), 14 (Sonoma) | Not supported since October 8, 2024. An upgrade to the current version is available. |
| ConceptDraw Office 11 | ConceptDraw MINDMAP 16; ConceptDraw PROJECT 15 ConceptDraw DIAGRAM 18 | October 8, 2024 | Microsoft Windows 10, 11 (64-bit certified) macOS 14 (Sonoma), 15 (Sequoia), | Current version. |
