= Brian F. Harris =

Australian businesspeople

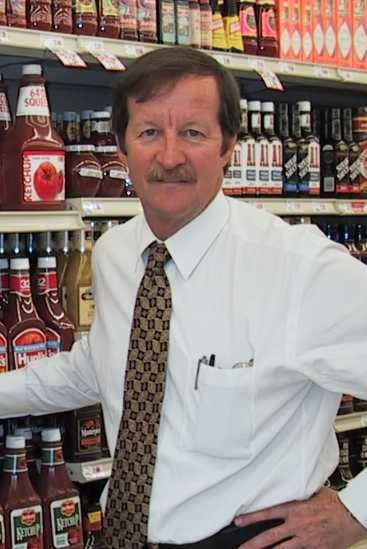
Brian F. Harris

Brian F. Harris is a former university professor at the University of Southern California (USC) and the originator of the study of category management.

== Career ==
Originally from Australia, Brian Harris earned a BA in Economics from the University of Queensland and an MBA from Lehigh University. Afterwards he received a PhD in Marketing from Michigan State University. Harris eventually became the Director of the Food Industry Management Program and a marketing professor in the Graduate School of Business Administration at the University of Southern California, where he co-founded the Quaker Oats Buying Skills Seminar. While Harris was a professor he developed a software program called Apollo Space Management System that could calculate the optimal level of space for products on a store shelf per category of product. The first in store testing and use of the program resulted in that store becoming the dominant shop in the region. The product was developed in conjunction with an organization called ABA Groups, which Harris founded.

In the late 1980s, Harris originated the concept of category management. The concept has evolved over time; however, the most commonly used category management model today was developed into an eight step procedure by Harris in 1997 and is called the Brian Harris Model. The basis of category management, according to Harris models, is to: force consumer focus during retail decisions; create strategy for differentiation and competition; provide a model for collaboration; promote information sharing for the sake of better decision-making; provide strategic logic when developing tactical decisions; clarify decisions when it comes to asset allocation; and clarify employee responsibilities.

In 1990, Harris founded a category management consultation services firm in Cincinnati called the Partnering Group. Over time, category management began to be delegated to specific suppliers instead of being used in-house, which was outside the spirit of Harris's original idea and a practice that Harris criticized. The Partnering Group became known for establishing best practice policies for collaborations between retailers and suppliers. These best practice guides have been adopted by the ECR Consortia in the US, Europe, and Brazil. Harris still serves as founder and chairman of the Partnering Group. Since its founding the Partnering Group has worked with retail clients in over 25 countries. Harris serves as an advisory board member for Local Express.
