= ConceptDraw MINDMAP =

Mind mapping and brainstorming software

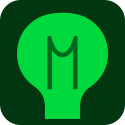
- Developer(s): Computer Systems Odessa LLC
- Initial release: 2001; 24 years ago
- Stable release: 16 / October 8, 2024; 7 months ago
- Operating system: Microsoft Windows, macOS
- Type: Mind mapping software
- License: Proprietary
- Website: ConceptDraw MINDMAP

ConceptDraw MINDMAP for macOS
- Operating system: macOS Sonoma; macOS Sequoia
- Website: www.conceptdraw.com/products/mind-map/

ConceptDraw MINDMAP for Windows
- Operating system: Windows 10; Windows 11
- Website: www.conceptdraw.com/products/mind-map/

ConceptDraw MINDMAP is proprietary mind mapping and brainstorming software developed by CS Odessa for Microsoft Windows and Apple macOS operating systems.

The mind mapping technology of visual thinking was invented by Tony Buzan in the 1960s. Along with the traditional practice of hand-drawn mind maps there is a range of special mind mapping software, which is commonly used to create mind maps for purposes of business, project management and knowledge management. The first version of ConceptDraw MINDMAP was released in 2001. Since 2008 it has been a part of the ConceptDraw OFFICE software package for Windows and macOS platform.

== File formats ==
- CDMZ - ConceptDraw MINDMAP document
- CDMM - ConceptDraw MINDMAP v5 and earlier document
- CDMTZ - ConceptDraw MINDMAP template

== Cross-Platform Compatibility ==
ConceptDraw MINDMAP is cross-platform compatible when running on macOS and Windows operating systems: files created on a computer power by macOS can be opened and edited on a Windows computer, and vice versa. The Developer's end-user license agreement allows for cross-platform installation with a single license.

== Export/Import ==
Using a standard file format allows interchange of files between: mind maps, project files and diagrams. ConceptDraw MINDMAP can import OPML files, text outlines, MS Project, MS Word and MS PowerPoint files, along with some mind mapping formats, such as MindManager, XMind and FreeMind. Export options include MS Project, MS Word, MS PowerPoint and MindManager as well, and also Adobe PDF, HTML, MP4, and a variety of graphics formats. Through the set of plug-ins ConceptDraw MINDMAP is compatible with Twitter, Evernote, MS Outlook and MS OneNote. Built-in ability to save mind maps to one of the following online services: OneDrive, Google Drive, and Dropbox makes further collaborative editing of mind maps available.

== See also ==
- Brainstorming
- Concept map
- Mind map
- Radial tree
- List of concept- and mind-mapping software
- List of educational software
