= DIMES =

Distributed Internet topology software

DIMES (Distributed Internet Measurements and Simulations) was a subproject of the EVERGROW Integrated Project in the EU Information Society Technologies, Future and Emerging Technologies programme. It studied the structure and topology of the Internet to obtain map and annotate it with delay, loss and link capacity.

DIMES used measurements by software agents downloaded by volunteers and installed on their privately owned machines. Once installed at the agent operates at a very low rate so as to have minimal impact on the machine performance and on its network connection. DIMES intended to explore relationships between the data gathered on the Internet's growth with geographical and socio-economic data, in particular for fast developing countries, to see if they can provide a measure of economic development and societal openness. The project published period maps at several aggregation levels on the web.

As of April 2007, over 12500 agents were installed by over 5500 users in about 95 nations, and in several hundreds of ASes. The project collected over 2.2 billion measurements.

== See also ==
- ETOMIC
- List of volunteer computing projects
- Network mapping
