= Ivan Maksakov =

Russian hacker (born 1983)

- Born: 25 February 1983 (age 42); Balakovo, Russia

Ivan Maksakov (born 25 February 1983) is a Russian hacker. He was one of the three men behind the start of DDoS attacks for hire and extortion. Ivan was most famously known as "eXe", but he also used the nicknames: NASA, b-boy, X, x890, and x3m1st.

A multinational law enforcement group made up of British, American, and Russian private individuals and law enforcement agents captured Maksakov, Alexander Petrov, and Denis Stepanov.

The three men were at the heart of an extortion ring which was extorting money from banks, Internet casinos, and other web based businesses. Reported damages caused by Maksakov, Petrov, and Stenanov range in the tens of millions of dollars. On October 8, 2007, Maksakov, Petrov, Stepanov were found guilty and sentenced to eight years in prison in the Russian Federation with a 100,000 ruble penalty.

== See also ==
- Fatal System Error
