= Network documentation =

Technical description of computer networks

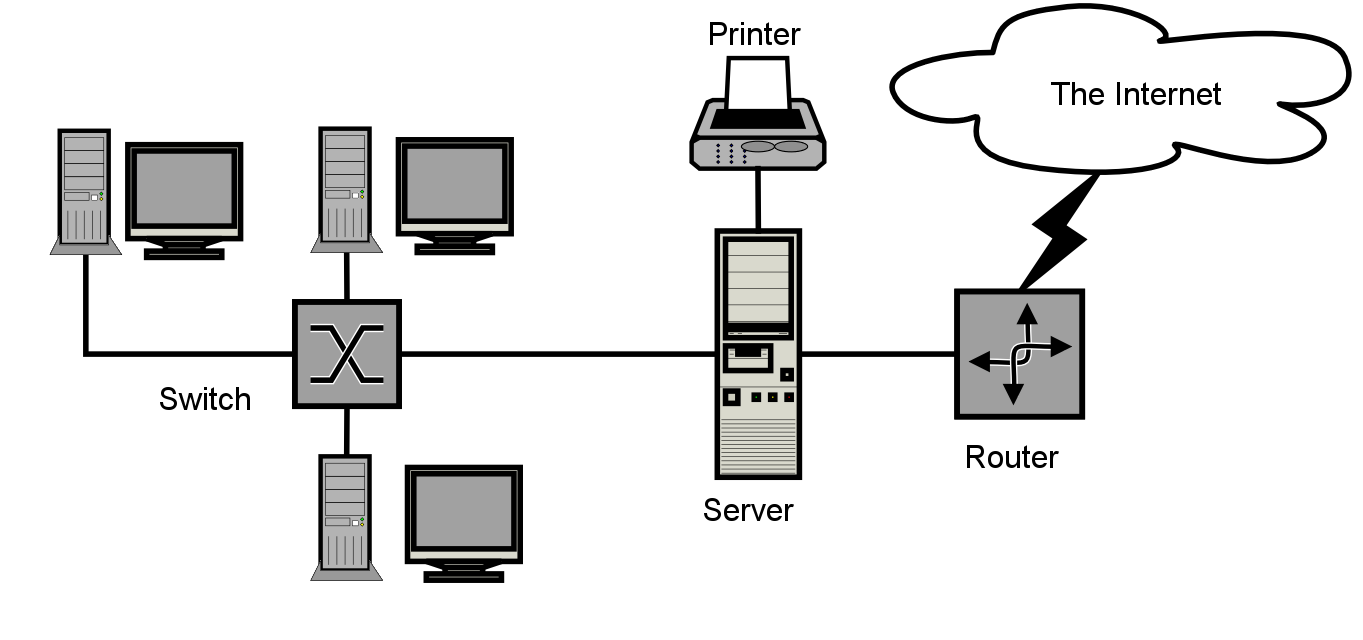
Example of a basic network diagram

Network documentation is a form of technical documentation, the goal of which is to maintain computer networks. It contains information about how the network is built, how it should perform, and where to troubleshoot problems. The purpose of network documentation is to keep networks running as smoothly as possible while minimizing downtime when repairs are necessary.

== Parts ==
Essential parts of network documentation include:

- Map of the entire network, including hardware locations for servers and network equipment and cabling details
- Metadata on the individual servers
- Schedules and locations of backups
- Metadata on installed software, including version numbers, installation dates, licensing details, and support information
- Vendor and contractor information
- Service agreements
- Detailed record of problems, solutions, procedures, and results

Network documentations could contain charts, tables, diagrams, and even memory aids that help administrators locate information faster.

== Documentation tools ==
Network documentation software ranges from general-purpose diagramming applications to specialized platforms for inventory, topology, and infrastructure management.

Specifically for diagramming, Microsoft Visio, Lucidchart, diagrams.net, and Gliffy are widely used for creating network diagrams, floor plans, and flowcharts.

For infrastructure documentation and IPAM, platforms such as Nautobot, Obelinf and netTerrain provide network management in a centralized database.
