= Alexander Petrov (hacker) =

Russian hacker

Alexander Petrov is a Russian hacker. He and two other men were responsible for DDoS for hire and extortion. A multinational law enforcement group of British, American and Russian private individuals and law enforcement agents captured Alexander Petrov and his two accomplices, Ivan Maksakov and Denis Stepanov.

The three were heading an extortion ring which was extorting money from various online services. The damages caused by the ring are in the millions of dollars range. On October 8, 2007, Petrov, Maksakov, and Stenanov were found guilty and were sentenced to eight years in prison in the Russian Federation and fined 100,000 rubles.

== See also ==
- Fatal System Error
