= SmartDraw =

Web-based diagram collaboration tool

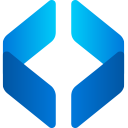
- SmartDraw logo
- Developers: SmartDraw, LLC
- Initial release: 1994; 32 years ago
- Platform: Web-based
- Type: Diagramming software
- License: 7 day trial and paid subscriptions
- Website: www.smartdraw.com

SmartDraw is a web-based tool for floor planning and other scaled drawings as well as traditional diagramming. SmartDraw can be used to create floor plans, evacuation plans, accident reconstruction diagrams, wiring diagrams, fire safety diagrams, crime scene diagrams, planograms and other layouts. It can also be used to create traditional diagrams like flowcharts, organization charts, mind maps, project charts and other diagrams.

== Integration and Add-Ons ==
SmartDraw lets users import existing floor plan PDFS or Google Maps images to be the foundation of their scaled drawing.

Users can also create custom libraries of symbols using their own product catalog and add propriety data.

Users can add diagrams to Microsoft Office products including Word, PowerPoint, and Excel and Google Workspace applications like Google Docs and Google Sheets.

SmartDraw lets users save files to SharePoint, OneDrive, Google Drive, Dropbox, and Box.

Users can also generate diagrams from data automatically through integrations with AWS, Microsoft Azure, Microsoft Entra ID, GitHub, and more.

SmartDraw has apps for Atlassian's Confluence, Jira, and Trello.

== Product history ==
Date	Name and version	Supported OS	Languages
1994	SmartDraw 1.0	Microsoft Windows	English
1995	SmartDraw 2.0	Microsoft Windows	English
1996	SmartDraw 3.0	Microsoft Windows	English
1999	SmartDraw 4.0	Microsoft Windows	English
2000	SmartDraw 5.0	Microsoft Windows	English, Japanese, French, German
2001	SmartDraw 6.0	Microsoft Windows	English, French, German
2004	SmartDraw 7.0	Microsoft Windows	English
2006	SmartDraw 2007	Microsoft Windows	English
2007	SmartDraw 2008	Microsoft Windows	English
2008	SmartDraw 2009	Microsoft Windows	English
2009	SmartDraw 2010	Microsoft Windows	English
2010	SmartDraw VP	Microsoft Windows	English
2011	SmartDraw 2012	Microsoft Windows	English
2012	SmartDraw 2013	Microsoft Windows	English
2013	SmartDraw 2014	Microsoft Windows	English
2014	SmartDraw CI	Microsoft Windows	English
2016	SmartDraw 2016	Microsoft Windows	English
2016	SmartDraw Cloud	Microsoft Windows, Web client	English
2017	SmartDraw 2017	Microsoft Windows	English
2018	SmartDraw	Microsoft Windows, Web client	More than 100 different languages: Spanish, Chinese, French, German, Japanese, Russian, Urdu, Hindi, and more.
2021	SmartDraw	Web-based platform only (Mac and Windows)	English
2025	SmartDraw	Web-based platform with real-time collaboration	English

== File Format ==
The following file extensions are specific to SmartDraw:

- .SDR – SmartDraw Documents – a binary file format used for saving SmartDraw documents.
- .SDT – Smart/Draw Templates – a binary file format used for saving SmartDraw reusable document templates.
- .SDL – SmartDraw Libraries – a binary file format used for saving symbol libraries in SmartDraw.
- .SCZ – SmartDraw Collections – a binary file format used for saving SmartDraw collections.

Can import files from Visio and Lucidchart.

== See also ==
- Floor plan
- Flowchart
- Data flow diagram
- List of concept- and mind-mapping software
- List of concept mapping software
- List of UML tools
- Mind mapping
- Technical drawing
- Visual communication
