= Visio Corporation =

American software company, 1989–2000

- Formerly: Axon Corporation (1989–1992); Shapeware Corporation (1992–1995)
- Traded as: Nasdaq: VSIO
- Industry: Software
- Founded: May 1, 1989
- Founders: Jeremy Jaech; Dave Walter; Ted Johnson
- Defunct: January 7, 2000
- Fate: Acquired by Microsoft Corporation
- Headquarters: Seattle, Washington
- Website: visio.com at the Wayback Machine (archived November 22, 1999)

Visio Corporation was a software company based in Seattle, Washington, best known for creating the Visio diagramming application. Founded in 1989 by alumni of Aldus Corporation, the company released its first product in 1992 and went public in 1995. On 7 January 2000, Microsoft acquired Visio Corporation in a stock swap valued at approximately US$1.5 billion, at the time Microsoft's largest acquisition. The product continues under the name Microsoft Visio.

== History ==
Axon Corporation was incorporated on 1 May 1989, shortly after Jeremy Jaech left Aldus Corporation. In summer 1990, Jaech and Ted Johnson developed the initial product concept, then recruited Dave Walter as the third co-founder. All three founders had worked at Aldus: Jaech and Walter were among Aldus's original founders, and Johnson had been the lead developer of Aldus PageMaker for Windows.

In 1992, before releasing any product, the company changed its name to Shapeware. It released its first application, Visio, in November of that year. Visio 4.0, released on 18 August 1995, was one of the first applications built specifically for Windows 95. In November 1995, Shapeware renamed itself Visio Corporation and completed an initial public offering on the Nasdaq under the ticker VSIO.

Microsoft Corporation acquired Visio on 7 January 2000 in a stock swap, giving Visio shareholders 0.45 Microsoft shares for each Visio share. Based on the value of Microsoft stock at closing, the transaction was worth approximately US$1.5 billion — at the time Microsoft's largest acquisition, a record that stood until the purchase of aQuantive.
