= Visio.M =

Electric car research project

Visio.M is a joint research project at the Technical University of Munich (TUM) to develop concepts to produce electric cars that are efficient, safe, and inexpensive. Lead manager of the project is BMW AG. Daimler AG is also participating in the consortium.

The project has received €7.1 million funding from the German Federal Ministry for Education and Research (BMBF).

The project aims to develop an electric vehicle with 15 kilowatts power and a maximum curb weight of 400 kg (without battery), meeting the requirements of the European regulatory category L7e. The aim is to have a production car by 2020.

Industrial partners:

- Autoliv BV & Co. KG
- the Federal Highway Research Institute (BAST)
- Continental Automotive GmbH
- E.ON AG
- Finepower GmbH
- Hyve AG
- IAV GmbH
- InnoZ GmbH
- Intermap Technologies GmbH
- LION Smart GmbH
- Neumayer Tekfor Holding GmbH
- Siemens AG
- Texas Instruments Germany GmbH
- TÜV SÜD AG
