= Planogram =

Plan of product placement in a store

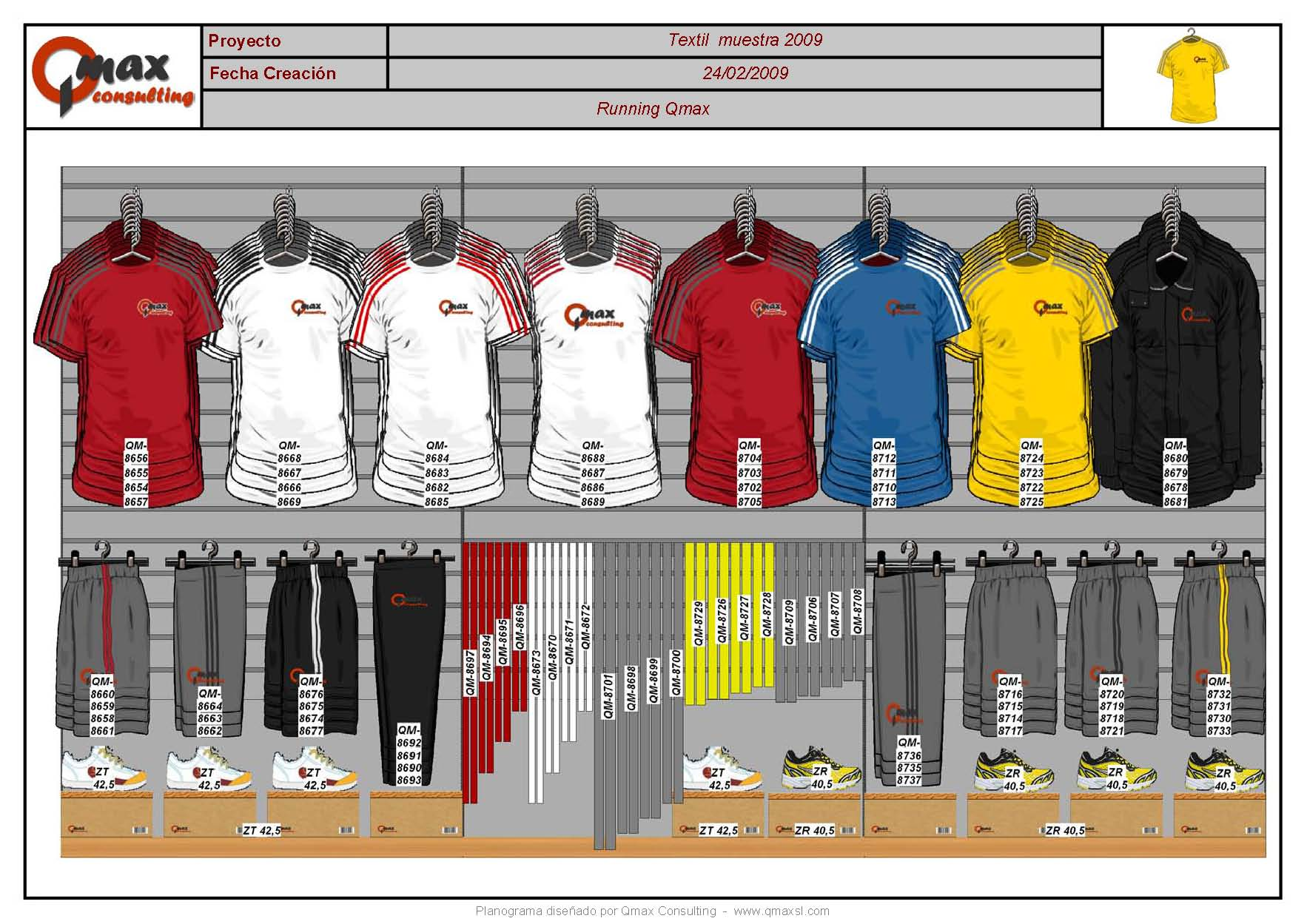
Example of a planogram featuring textile products

A planogram, often abbreviated POG, is a plan that specifies where each product sits on a store's shelves and other fixtures and how much of that space it occupies. For each product it records a position, how many units face the shopper, and how many are stacked above and held behind them. Planograms are a central tool of visual merchandising and category management.

Producing a planogram means balancing the effect of shelf space and position on sales against the need to keep products in stock, merchandising rules and commitments to suppliers, and in practice still relies heavily on planners' experience and trial and error. Research on how shelf space affects sales dates from the 1960s, and personal-computer planning software was in wide use by the early 1990s. Planograms are shared in a variety of formats, including images, documents and data files, and computer vision is increasingly used to check that stores follow them.

== History ==
Retailers have long treated shelf space as a scarce resource to be allocated deliberately, and from the early 1960s researchers began measuring how that allocation affected sales. Controlled experiments in supermarkets in the late 1960s and early 1970s found that doubling the number of facings given to a product raised its sales by roughly a fifth, a relationship later termed space elasticity. These findings were first built into mathematical models for allocating shelf space in the early 1970s, and research on the problem has continued since, with published work increasing sharply after 2000.

Merriam-Webster dates the first known use of the word planogram to 1986. By the early 1990s, numerous personal-computer shelf-management systems were available to retailers, including Apollo from Information Resources and Spaceman from Nielsen; although they offered optimisation features, retailers used them mainly for "planogram accounting", reducing the time spent manually arranging shelves. Successor packages remain in use, and the research literature continues to note a gap between commercial software, which relies mainly on data processing with limited use of mathematical optimisation, and academic models.

== Shelf space planning ==
A planogram is the output of shelf space planning, the stage of category management that follows the choice of assortment and precedes decisions about replenishment. Retailers usually fix how much space a category receives within the store first, then plan the products within it. For each product the planner, generally called a merchandiser, decides how much space it receives and in how many facings, which shelf it sits on, where on the shelf it goes, what stands beside it and which way it faces. The fixtures themselves are typically treated as fixed, since retailers rarely alter shelving when reallocating products.

=== Demand ===
Experiments since the 1960s have shown that a product sells more when given more facings, with diminishing returns; a meta-analysis of 1,268 estimates put the average space elasticity at 17%. Position matters at least as much. One field study found that average sales rose by 39% between the worst and best shelf height, by 15% between the worst and best horizontal position, and by 59% when both were combined, and another found products on the top shelf 17% more likely to be noticed and 20% more likely to be chosen than those on the bottom. Products between roughly eye and knee level are the most likely to be seen, and horizontal position has a weaker effect than height. Arranging related products in families and rectangular blocks increases attention, although excessive visual complexity reduces it. Only about 30% of purchase decisions are settled before a shopper enters the store, which is why placement carries this weight.

=== Availability ===
The number of facings and the units held behind each facing together determine how much stock the shelf holds, and therefore how often it must be refilled and how likely it is to run empty. Running out is costly. Out-of-stock rates for fast-moving consumer goods have stayed at around 8% since at least the mid-1990s; when a product is missing, fewer than half of shoppers buy a substitute and nearly a third go to another store, retailers lose around 4% of sales as a result, and about three quarters of stock-outs originate inside the store, in ordering errors and in shelves left unfilled from the backroom. Planners therefore set minimum quantities and safety stock for each product, and may give a product more facings than its sales alone would justify so that enough stock is held between deliveries; perishables carry upper limits instead, to limit how long stock sits on the shelf. One study concluded that once enough stock is held to avoid running out, position affects sales more than additional facings do.

=== Rules and agreements ===
Demand and availability are balanced against merchandising rules and commercial commitments. Rules keep products of the same brand or type together in blocks, fix the order in which they appear, and place heavy or bulky items on lower shelves. Minimum facings may be set for newly listed products so that they have a chance to establish themselves, and maximums for strong sellers to leave room for the rest of the range. Suppliers also shape the plan. Retailers may commit to shelf shares in supply agreements, charge slotting fees for placing new products, and appoint a leading supplier as category captain to advise on, and sometimes draft, the planogram for a category, a practice that has drawn scrutiny from competition regulators. Secondary placements, such as gondola ends, are often planned separately from the main fixture.

=== Practice ===
Because fixture widths can differ between stores, retailers may plan a template for a cluster of similar stores and derive store-specific versions from it. Mathematical models that weigh these factors have existed since the 1970s, but planning in practice still relies heavily on planners' experience and trial and error, and commercial software is used mostly to draw and replicate plans; its optimisation features see little use. Research has turned to tailoring plans to individual stores with differing demand, and to applying predictive analytics to the forecasts that feed them.

== Data representation ==
A planogram is produced in space-planning software and may be shared in a variety of formats, such as an image of the intended layout, a document, or a text file listing the products in order on each shelf. The plan records the fixtures and the shelves within them, with their widths, heights and depths. For each product it records its site on the shelf: the space allocated to it, the number of facings, how many units are stacked and how many stand behind each facing, together with rules such as minimum or maximum quantities set by the retailer, and any storage requirements such as chilling. The product's own dimensions and images are held separately as master data, and the dimensions determine how many units fit that site. Standards such as GS1's define how height, width and depth are measured from a product's "default front", which may differ from how it is sited on the shelf, and how product images for space planning are captured, cropped and named. Approaches to automated analysis include representing a planogram as a graph in which each node is a facing and edges link neighbouring facings.

Plans are revised periodically, typically when the assortment changes or the space given to a category changes.

Checking compliance between the planned and actual shelf by computer vision, comparing photographs of the fixture with the planogram to find missing or wrongly sited products, is increasingly possible; one such system has been deployed across more than 7,000 stores of a single convenience chain.
