= Fatal System Error =

2010 nonfiction book by Joseph Menn

- First edition cover
- Author: Joseph Menn
- Language: English
- Genre: Nonfiction
- Publisher: PublicAffairs
- Publication date: 2010
- Publication place: United States
- Media type: Print (hardback & paperback)
- Pages: 304 pp
- ISBN: 978-1-58648-748-5

Fatal System Error (2010) is a book by Joseph Menn, an investigative technology reporter at The Washington Post, and previously with Reuters, the Financial Times and Los Angeles Times.

The book investigates the espionage network of international mobsters and hackers who use the Internet to extort money from businesses, steal from tens of millions of consumers, and attack government networks.

The main focus of the book is on Barrett Lyon and Andy Crocker and the capture of cybercriminals Ivan Maksakov, Alexander Petrov, and Denis Stepanov.
