= Topology of the World Wide Web =

World Wide Web topology is distinct from Internet topology. While the former focuses on how web pages are interconnected through hyperlinks, the latter refers to the layout of network infrastructure like routers, ISPs, and backbone connections.

The Jellyfish model of the World Wide Web topology represents the web as a core of highly connected nodes (web pages) surrounded by layers of less connected nodes. The Bow Tie model, on the other hand, divides the web into distinct zones: a strongly connected core, an 'IN' group leading into the core, an 'OUT' group leading out, and disconnected components. This model emphasizes the flow of hyperlinks between different parts of the web..

== Models of web page topology ==
=== Jellyfish Model ===
The simplistic Jellyfish model of the World Wide Web centers around a large strongly connected core of high-degree web pages that form a clique; pages such that there is a path from any page within the core to any other page. In other words, starting from any node within the core, it is possible to visit any other node in the core just by clicking hyperlinks. From there, a distinction is made between pages of single degree and those of higher order degree. Pages with many links form rings around the center, with all such pages that are a single link away from the core making up the first ring, all such pages that are two links away from the core making up the second ring, and so on. Then from each ring, pages of single degree are depicted as hanging downward, with a page linked by the core hanging from the center, for example. In this manner, the rings form a sort of dome away from the center that is reminiscent of a jellyfish, with the hanging nodes making up the creature's tentacles.

=== Bow Tie Model ===
The Bow Tie model comprises four main groups of web pages, plus some smaller ones. Like the Jellyfish model there is a strongly connected core. There are two other large groups, roughly of equal sizes. One consists of all pages that link to the strongly connected core, but which have no links from the core back out to them. This is the "Origination" or "In" group, as it contains links that lead into the core and originate outside it. The counterpart to this is the group of all pages that the strongly connected core links to, but which have no links back into the core. This is the "Termination" or "Out" group, as it contains links that lead out of the core and terminate outside it. A fourth group is all the disconnected pages, which neither link to the core nor are linked from it.

The Bow Tie model has additional, smaller groups of web pages. Both the "In" and "Out" groups have smaller "Tendrils" leading to and from them. These consist of pages that link to and from the "In" and "Out" group but are not part of either to begin with, in essence the "Origination" and "Termination" groups of the larger "In" and "Out". This can be carried on ad nauseam, adding tendrils to the tendrils, and so on. Additionally, there is another important group known as "Tubes". This group consists of pages accessible from "In" and which link to "Out", but which are not part of the large core. Visually, they form alternative routes from "In" to "Out", like tubes bending around the central strongly connected component.

== See also ==
- Webgraph
