= Microsoft Visio =

Diagramming and vector graphics software application

- Microsoft Visio 2021 Professional on Windows 10
- Original author: Visio Corporation
- Developer: Microsoft
- Release: 1992; 34 years ago

Stable release(s)
- Office 2024 (LTSC): 2408 (Build 17932.20976) / 8 September 2026; 8 days ago
- Office 2021 (LTSC): 2108 (Build 14334.20906) / 8 September 2026; 8 days ago
- Office 2019 (LTSC): 1808 (Build 10417.20207) / 8 September 2026; 8 days ago
- Office 2021–24 (Retail): 2608 (Build 20326.20144) / 8 September 2026; 8 days ago
- Office 2019 (Retail): 2509 (Build 19231.20194) / 14 October 2025; 11 months ago
- Operating system: Microsoft Windows
- Type: Diagramming software
- License: Trialware
- Website: www.microsoft.com/en/microsoft-365/visio?market=af

Microsoft Visio (/ˈvɪz.i.oʊ/, VIZ-ee-oh), formerly Microsoft Office Visio, is a diagramming and vector graphics application and is part of the Microsoft 365 Business. The product was first introduced in 1992 by former American software company Visio Corporation, and its latest version is Visio 2024. Microsoft acquired the assets of Visio Corporation in 2000 and thus also inherited the licensing agreements for the Visio application. A lightweight version of Visio is now included with all commercial SKU of Microsoft 365 and is known as Visio in Microsoft 365. It has two other subscription based SKUs. Visio Plan 1 includes the Visio web app whereas Visio Plan 2 provides access to both the web app and the Desktop application.

== Features ==
Microsoft Visio is used to create diagram types such as flowcharts, org charts, floor plans, network diagrams, UML diagrams, mind maps and more. It is also commonly used for scenarios such as Process Mapping and Visual Collaboration. The latest version of Visio also has data visualization that allows users to create diagrams from Excel data and also embed Visio diagrams in Power BI dashboards.

Microsoft made Visio 2013 for Windows available in two editions: Standard and Professional. The Standard and Professional editions share the same interface, but the Professional edition has additional templates for more advanced diagrams and layouts, as well as capabilities intended to make it easy for users to connect their diagrams to data sources and to display their data graphically. The Professional edition features three additional diagram types, as well as intelligent rules, validation, and subprocess (diagram breakdown). Visio Professional is also offered as an additional component of an Office365 subscription.

On September 22, 2015, Visio 2016 was released alongside Microsoft Office 2016. A few new features were added, including one-step connectivity to Excel data, information-rights management (IRM) protection for Visio files, modernized shapes for office layout, detailed shapes for site plans, updated shapes for floor plans, modern shapes for home plans, IEEE-compliant shapes for electrical diagrams, new range of starter diagrams, and new themes for the Visio interface.

Database modelling in Visio revolves around a Database Model Diagram (DMD).

=== File formats ===
Native file formats
- Icons for .vsdx (left) and .vss (right) files
- VSD: Visio 2003–2010 Drawing
- VSS: Stencil
- VST: Template
- VDW: Web drawing
- VDX: XML drawing (Discontinued)
- VSX: XML stencil (Discontinued)
- VTX: XML template (Discontinued)
- VSDX: OPC/XML drawing, Current Visio drawing
- VSDM: OPC/XML drawing, macro-enabled
- VSSX: OPC/XML stencil
- VSSM: OPC/XML stencil, macro-enabled
- VSTX: OPC/XML template
- VSTM: OPC/XML template, macro-enabled
- VSL: Add-on

All of the previous versions of Visio used VSD, the proprietary binary-file format. Visio 2010 added support for the VDX file format, which is a well-documented XML Schema-based ("DatadiagramML") format, but still uses VSD by default only.

Visio 2013 drops support for writing VDX files in favor of the new VSDX and VSDM file formats, and uses them by default. Created based on Open Packaging Conventions (OPC) standard (ISO 29500, Part 2), a VSDX or VSDM file consists of a group of XML files archived inside a Zip file. VSDX and VSDM files differ only in that VSDM files may contain macros. Since these files are susceptible to macro virus infection, the program enforces strict security on them.

While VSD files use LZW-like lossless compression, VDX is not compressed. Hence, a VDX file typically takes up 3 to 5 times more storage. VSDX and VSDM files use the same compression as Zip files.

Visio also supports saving files in SVG files, other diagramming files and images. However, images cannot be opened by the program.

== History ==
Visio began as a standalone product produced by Shapeware Corporation; version 1.0 shipped in 1992. A pre-release, Version 0.92, was distributed free on a floppy disk along with a Microsoft Windows systems readiness evaluation utility. In 1995, Shapeware Corporation changed their name to Visio Corporation to take advantage of market recognition and related product equity. Microsoft acquired Visio in 2000, re-branding it as a Microsoft Office application. However, it has only been released as a separate product. Microsoft included a Visio for Enterprise Architects edition with some editions of Visual Studio .NET 2003 and Visual Studio 2005.

Along with Microsoft Visio 2002 Professional, Microsoft introduced Visio Enterprise Network Tools and Visio Network Center. Visio Enterprise Network Tools was an add-on product that enabled automated network and directory services diagramming. Visio Network Center was a subscription-based website where users could locate the latest network documentation content and exact-replica network equipment shapes from 500 leading manufacturers. Visio Enterprise Network Tools was discontinued in July 2002. The following year, Microsoft released a patch which gave Enterprise Network Tools users access to the network equipment shapes via Visio's built-in Find Shape feature. Visio 2007 was released on November 30, 2006.

Microsoft Visio adopted ribbons in its user interface in Visio 2010. Microsoft Word, Excel, PowerPoint, Access and Outlook (to some extents) had already adopted the ribbon with the release of Microsoft Office 2007.

November 19, 2012: BPMN 2.0 was utilized within Microsoft Visio.

=== Versions ===
- Visio v1.0 (Standard, Lite, Home)
- Visio v2.0
- Visio v3.0
- Visio v4.0 (Standard, Technical)
- Visio v4.1 (Standard, Technical)
- Visio v4.5 (Standard, Professional, Technical)
- Visio v5.0 (Standard, Professional, Technical)
- Visio 2000 (v6.0; Standard, Professional, Technical, Enterprise) – originally released only Visio, later updated to SP1 and Microsoft branding after Visio Corporation's acquisition
- Visio 2002 (v10.0; Standard, Professional) – first version of Visio overall to be a Microsoft Office application after Visio Corporation's acquisition
  - Visio for Enterprise Architects 2003 (VEA 2003) – based on Visio 2002 and included with Visual Studio .NET 2003 Enterprise Architect edition
- Office Visio 2003 (v11.0; Standard, Professional)
  - Office Visio for Enterprise Architects 2005 (VEA 2005) – based on Visio 2003 and included with Visual Studio 2005 Team Suite and Team Architect editions
- Office Visio 2007 (v12.0; Standard, Professional)
- Visio 2010 (v14.0; Standard, Professional, Premium)
- Visio 2013 (v15.0; Standard, Professional)
- Visio 2016 (v16.0; Standard, Professional, Office 365)
- Visio Online Plan 1 (Web based editor), Visio Online Plan 2 (Desktop, Office 365)
- Visio 2019 (v16.0; Standard, Professional)
- Visio 2021 (Standard, Professional) - this was the first version offered under the Long-Term Servicing Channel (LTSC) model
- Visio 2024 (Standard, Professional)

There are no Visio versions 7, 8, or 9, because after Microsoft acquired and branded Visio as a Microsoft Office product, the Visio version numbers followed the Office version numbers. Version 13 was also skipped owing to triskaidekaphobia.

Visio does not have a macOS version, which has led to the growth of several third-party applications which can open and edit Visio files on Mac.

On 7 May 2001, Microsoft introduced Visio Enterprise Network Tools (VENT), an add-on for Visio 2002 scheduled for release on 1 July 2001, and Visio Network Center, a subscription-based web service for IT professionals who use Microsoft Visio for computer network diagramming. VENT was discontinued on 1 July 2002 because of very low customer demand.

== See also ==
- Concept map
- Diagram
- Flowchart
- List of concept- and mind-mapping software
- Comparison of project management software
- Network diagram software
