= ArcaMax Publishing =

American web syndication service

- Company type: Private
- Industry: Web syndication
- Founded: 1996 or 1999
- Headquarters: Newport News, Virginia, United States
- Key people: Scott Wolf president & CEO; Hugh Spain managing editor
- Number of employees: 11 (2006)
- Website: ArcaMax.com

ArcaMax Publishing is a privately owned American web/email syndication news publisher that provides editorial content, columns & features, comic strips, and editorial cartoons via email. ArcaMax also produces co-branded newsletters with corporate clients.

The company is based in Newport News, Virginia. Its revenue comes from advertising. Potential subscribers typically come from topical banners or co-registration for related topical sites or newsletters; as this approach can be exploited by spam purveyors, the company conducts an initial source evaluation before contacting potential subscribers by email to complete a "double opt-in" circuit aimed to decrease the amount of company resources expended on un-deliverable email communications, while at the same time reducing to a minimum the number of emails sent to people who are not interested in receiving them.

== History ==
ArcaMax originally sold educational materials at the cost of shipping and handling. By July 2004, the company began distributing ezines, which eventually featured health and fitness, money management and automotive advice, among other topics. Their first high-profile syndicated features were Garfield and Dear Abby. Currently the company offers more than "90 comic strips, many more advice and political columnists, news headlines, videos, and games."

Around 2006, the company began the Arcamax Book Club, which delivered book chapters to subscribers via email.

== Comic strips ==
ArcaMax syndicates their content digitally through arrangements with other (print) syndicates, primarily Andrews McMeel Syndication (formerly Universal Uclick), Creators Syndicate, and King Features Syndicate.

- 1 and Done
- 9 Chickweed Lane
- Agnes
- Andy Capp
- Archie
- Arctic Circle
- The Argyle Sweater
- Ask Shagg
- Aunty Acid
- BC
- Baby Blues
- Ballard Street
- The Barn
- Barney & Clyde
- Barney Google and Snuffy Smith
- Beetle Bailey
- Bizarro
- Blondie
- The Boondocks
- Breaking Cat News
- The Brilliant Mind of Edison Lee
- Candorville
- Carpe Diem
- Cathy
- Crankshaft
- Cul de Sac
- Curtis
- Daddy Daze
- Daddy's Home
- Dennis the Menace
- Diamond Lil
- The Dinette Set
- Dog eat Doug
- Dogs of C-Kennel
- Doonesbury
- Dustin
- The Family Circus
- Flo & Friends
- For Better or For Worse
- For Heaven's Sake
- Fort Knox
- Free Range
- Garfield
- Get Fuzzy
- Ginger Meggs
- Hägar the Horrible
- Heathcliff
- Herb and Jamaal
- Hi and Lois
- Intelligent Life
- Jerry King Cartoons
- Little Dog Lost
- The Lockhorns
- Long Story Short
- Loose Parts
- Luann
- Mallard Fillmore
- Marvin
- Master Strokes: Golf Tips
- The Meaning of Lila
- Mike du Jour
- Momma
- Mother Goose and Grimm
- Mutts
- Nest Heads
- Non Sequitur
- One Big Happy
- The Other Coast
- The Pajama Diaries
- Peanuts
- Pearls Before Swine
- Pickles
- Poorly Drawn Lines
- Red and Rover
- Reply All
- Rhymes with Orange
- Rose Is Rose
- Rubes
- Rudy Park
- Rugrats
- Sarah's Scribbles
- Scary Gary
- Shoe
- Spectickles
- Speed Bump
- Strange Brew
- Take it From the Tinkersons
- Wallace the Brave
- Wee Pals
- The Wizard of Id
- Working it Out
- Wumo
- Zack Hill
- Zits

== See also ==
- DailyINK / Comics Kingdom
- GoComics
