= Cartoonists Remember 9/11 =

2011 series of comic strips

Cartoonists Remember 9/11 is a series of comic strips run on the tenth anniversary of the September 11, 2001 attacks on the United States. It included cartoonists from King Features Syndicate, Creators Syndicate, Tribune Media Services, Universal Press Syndicate, and Washington Post Writers Group.

== History ==
Brendan Burford, comics editor for King Features, said, "Readers look to the comics page to reflect the national conversation, and on Sunday, Sept. 11, that's going to be the conversation."

Jeff Keane, co-author of The Family Circus told the Associated Press, "I knew that it was something that I think would work for Family Circus if I could find the approach for it. Because Family Circus is more of a realistic look at family, and I don't necessarily have a cartoon that is a 'joke a day,' but more sentimental and more emotional, it was easier for me to look at it that way." Jim Borgman, co-creator of Zits agreed, "As a cartoonist we would have all been wondering 'Is it OK to deal with this topic in our work?' Of course you can, but there is something comforting about the thought that a bunch of us are going to be struggling to say something on that day. My colleagues – cartoonists – are an astonishingly varied and talented group of people. I fully expect we'll see a broad range of approaches that day."

== Exhibitions ==
The works were exhibited at the Newseum in Washington, D.C., the Cartoon Art Museum in San Francisco, the ToonSeum in Pittsburgh, New York City's Museum of Comic and Cartoon Art (MoCCA) and the Society of Illustrators in New York City.

== Participating strips ==
- Agnes
- Apartment 3-G
- Archie
- Arctic Circle
- Ask Shagg
- B.C.
- Baby Blues
- Barney & Clyde
- Beetle Bailey
- Between Friends
- Big Nate
- Bleeker: The Rechargeable Dog
- Blondie
- Brewster Rockit: Space Guy!
- Buckets
- Buckles
- Candorville
- Chuckle Bros
- Crankshaft
- Curtis
- Daddy's Home
- Deflocked
- Dennis the Menace
- Dick Tracy
- Dog Eat Doug
- Dogs of C-Kennel
- Doonesbury
- Dustin
- Edge City
- The Elderberries
- Family Circus
- Fort Knox
- Freshly Squeezed
- Funky Winkerbean
- Gasoline Alley
- Grand Avenue
- Hägar the Horrible
- Heart of the City
- Heathcliff
- Heaven's Love Thrift Shop
- Herb and Jamaal
- Hi and Lois
- Home and Away
- Ink Pen
- La Cucaracha
- Liō
- Little Dog Lost
- Luann
- Mallard Fillmore
- Mark Trail
- Marvin
- Mary Worth
- Momma
- Mother Goose and Grimm
- Mutts
- Nancy
- Ollie and Quentin
- On a Claire Day
- On the Fastrack
- One Big Happy
- Over the Hedge
- Pardon My Planet
- Pluggers
- Pooch Cafe
- Prickly City
- Pros & Cons
- Real Life Adventures
- Red and Rover
- Reply All
- Retail
- Rhymes with Orange
- Rubes
- Safe Havens
- Sally Forth
- Sherman's Lagoon
- Shoe
- Six Chix
- Snuffy Smith
- Speed Bump
- Stone Soup
- Strange Brew
- Tank McNamara
- The Amazing Spider-Man
- The Brilliant Mind of Edison Lee
- The Duplex
- The Meaning of Lila
- The Other Coast
- The Pajama Diaries
- Tina's Groove
- Todd The Dinosaur
- Wizard of Id
- You Can With Beakman and Jax
- Zack Hill
- Zippy the Pinhead
- Zits
