= Richard S. Newcombe =

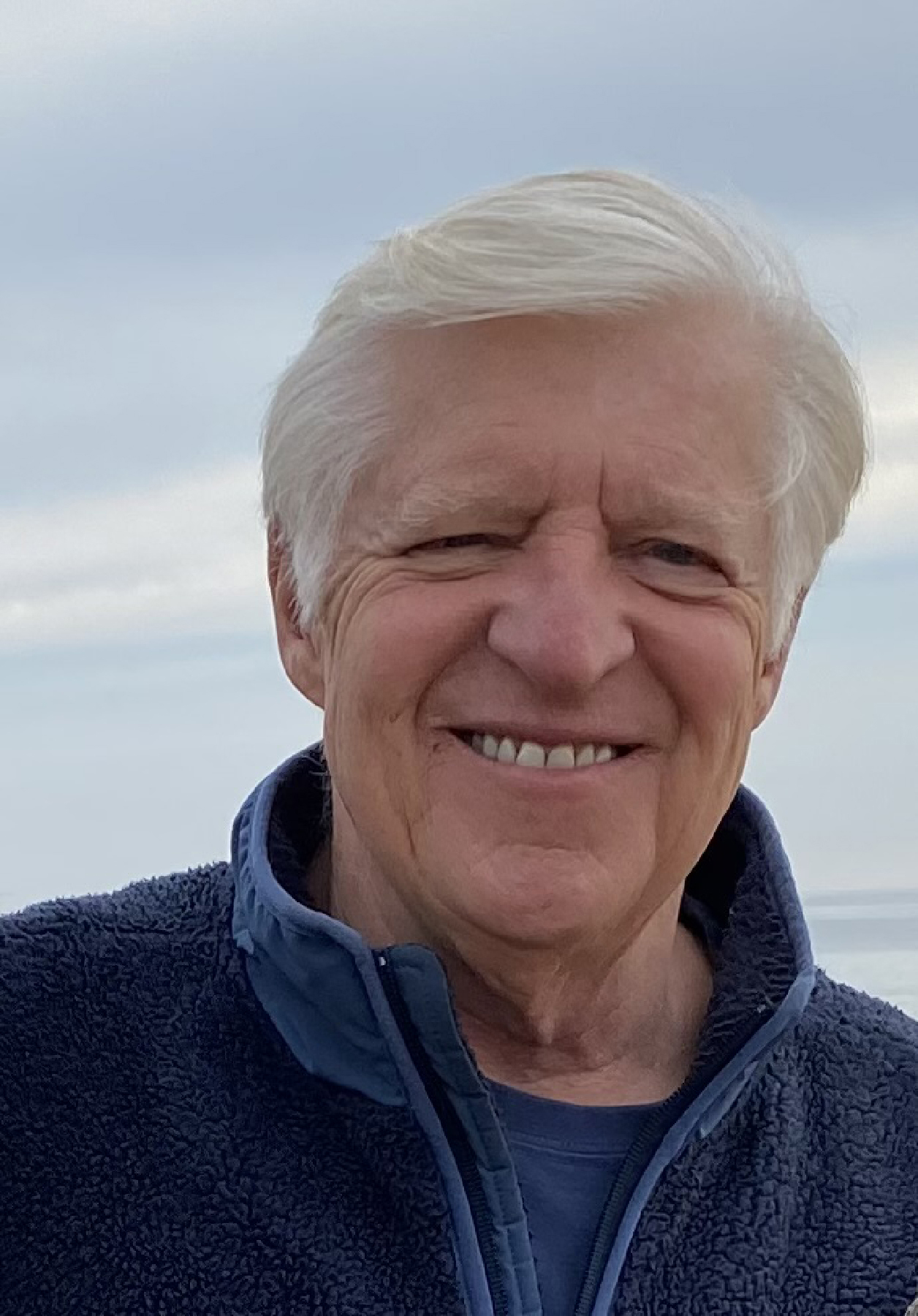
- Born: 8 August 1950 (age 74); Winnetka, Illinois, U.S.
- Education: Georgetown University (BA); University of Chicago
- Occupation(s): Chairman and CEO of Creators Syndicate
- Board member of: Creators Syndicate
- Spouse: Caroline Bermeo (1975-present)
- Children: Sara, Jack
- Website: Creators

Richard S. Newcombe (born August 8, 1950) is the founder and chairman of Creators Syndicate, which currently represents more than 200 writers and artists and has expanded to include Creators Publishing. Since the company's founding in 1987, the roster of talent has included Ann Landers, Hillary Clinton, Bill O'Reilly, Hunter S. Thompson, Herblock and the comic strips B.C., The Wizard of Id, Archie and Mickey Mouse. Creators Syndicate is located in Hermosa Beach, California, and distributes its content to 2,400 newspapers, magazines, websites and other digital outlets around the world.

== Early life and education ==
Newcombe was born on August 8, 1950, in Chicago. His father, Leo Newcombe, served as senior vice president for the newspaper division of Field Enterprises and as general manager of the Chicago Daily News and the Chicago Sun-Times. Leo and Ann Newcombe had eight children, and they lived in Winnetka, Illinois.

In 1969, Newcombe was one of the first graduates of La Lumiere School, a small high school with boarding and day students that was founded in 1963 in La Porte, Indiana. Newcombe then attended Georgetown University in Washington, D.C., where he was one of the founding editors of The Georgetown Voice, and a member of Phi Beta Kappa, and graduated magna cum laude.

== Career ==
=== Publishing ===
After graduating from Georgetown University in three years, Newcombe worked as an advertising copywriter at Leo Burnett Worldwide and then as a sales manager in Chicago with Success Motivation Institute, based in Waco, Texas. While working, he attended the MBA program at the graduate business school at the University of Chicago. He also worked in sales at David H. Sandler & Associates, based in Baltimore. From 1974 to 1978, Newcombe worked as a reporter and editor at United Press International.

==== Los Angeles Times Syndicate and News America Syndicate ====
In 1978, Newcombe became vice president and general manager of the Los Angeles Times Syndicate. In 1984, he was named president of News America Syndicate, which then was the third-largest syndicate in the world and owned by Rupert Murdoch.

==== Creators Syndicate ====
Three years later, Newcombe left News America Syndicate to form Creators Syndicate, an American independent distributor of comic strips and syndicated columns to daily newspapers and websites. Creators Syndicate was founded in Los Angeles, on February 13, 1987, and later moved to Hermosa Beach, California in 2012.

Creators Syndicate revolutionized the syndication industry by being the first to offer cartoonists ownership rights to their work. The industry standard before Creators’ founding was for the syndicate to own the rights to their cartoonists’ creations — the name, characters and likenesses. Rudolph Dirks created the hugely successful comic strip, The Katzenjammer Kids, which first appeared in print in 1897. In 1912, Dirks challenged William Randolph Hearst for ownership rights to his comic strip, and ultimately Hearst prevailed, which set the tone for the industry until Creators Syndicate’s founding.

Many cartoonists seethed at what they perceived to be the unfairness of this system. The most famous of them, Milton Caniff, walked away in 1946 from the enormously popular Terry and the Pirates comic strip because his syndicate insisted that they own his creation. In 1947 he created Steve Canyon because Marshall Field III, who owned the Chicago Sun and its syndicate, allowed him to own the rights to his comic strip, one of the very few exceptions at that time. After Creators Syndicate was founded, Caniff sent Newcombe a postcard saying, “To put it on the record: Hooray!!!"

Pulitzer Prize-winning cartoonist Mike Peters told Editor & Publisher magazine, "It's long overdue that syndicates realize a new day is here. Indentured servitude went out in the 1500s." Johnny Hart, creator of B.C. and The Wizard of Id, called Creators “a history-making venture in syndication.” Bil Keane, creator of The Family Circus, described Creators Syndicate as “the first breath of fresh air the syndicates have had in 100 years of existence.” The New York Times ran a story about Newcombe with the headline, “A Superhero for Cartoonists?” Today, largely as a result of Creators Syndicate, all syndicates grant cartoonists ownership rights to their work.

Within a few months of forming his media company, Newcombe had acquired the syndication rights to Ann Landers, then the world's most widely syndicated newspaper columnist, the comic strip B.C. by Johnny Hart, and the political cartoons of Herblock, The Washington Post’s legendary editorial cartoonist. In addition to Herblock, Newcombe has also worked with Pulitzer Prize-winning cartoonists Bill Mauldin, Michael Ramirez, Paul Conrad, Mike Luckovich, Paul Szep, Doug Marlette and Steve Breen. Other award-winning political cartoonists include Chip Bok, Steve Kelley, Chuck Asay, Bob Gorrell, John Deering, A.F. Branco, Al Goodwyn, Steve Benson and Gary Varvel.

Over the years, Newcombe and Creators has syndicated some of the most important figures of our time, including Pope John Paul II, Richard Nixon, Hillary Clinton, Jimmy Carter, Nancy Reagan, Henry Kissinger, Erma Bombeck, Art Buchwald, Joyce Jillson, Jeane Dixon, Sydney Omarr, Carl Rowan, Robert Novak, Dan Quayle and Oliver North. Newcombe also has syndicated Bill O'Reilly, Molly Ivins, Tucker Carlson, Froma Harrop, Larry Kudlow, John Stossel, Hunter S. Thompson, Larry Elder, Arianna Huffington, Tony Kornheiser, Patrick Buchanan, Dennis Prager, Ben Shapiro, Thomas Sowell, Walter E. Williams, Michelle Malkin, Mona Charen, Ben Carson, Star Parker, Mark Shields and Susan Estrich. Other columnists include Alexander Cockburn, Robert Scheer, David Nyhan, Brent Bozell, Tony Snow, Tony Blankley, Eric Breindel, Chandra Bozelko, and Benazir Bhutto.

In addition to B.C., Creators comic strips include The Wizard of Id, One Big Happy, Speed Bump, Chuckle Brothers, Agnes, Ballard Street, Liberty Meadows, Rubes, The Other Coast, Archie, Long Story Short, Batman, Zorro, Teenage Mutant Ninja Turtles, Mickey Mouse and Donald Duck. He also syndicated The Far Side internationally.

In 2008, Creators Syndicate acquired the Copley News Service, a wire service that distributed news, political cartoons, and opinion columns. In 1991 Creators Syndicate took over Heritage Features Syndicate at The Heritage Foundation in Washington, D.C.

In 2011, Jack Newcombe was appointed president of Creators Syndicate, and together with Rick Newcombe established Creators Publishing and the imprint Sumner Books, which have published hundreds of titles, including the bestselling "Facts Don’t Care About Your Feelings" by Ben Shapiro. Other bestsellers include What I Believe by Ben Carson, which includes an introduction by Rick Newcombe. One of Sumner Books most successful projects is the "Stories of Success" series by best-selling author Horatio Alger, which have particular appeal to homeschooling parents.

=== Controversies ===
After 25 years of operating in Los Angeles, Creators Syndicate moved to nearby Hermosa Beach, California following a tax dispute with the city. In 1992, Creators and the city had a series of hearings to determine the category of tax classification for the company. Once that was determined, Creators stayed in Los Angeles. But in 2007, the city reneged and wanted Creators moved to a much higher tax classification retroactively for five years with interest and penalties. Creators filed a lawsuit against the city and prevailed.

Newcombe gave Arianna Huffington her start as a syndicated columnist in 1996, but they parted ways in 1998 after Sheila Lawrence, widow of U.S. Ambassador to Switzerland Larry Lawrence, filed a $25 million lawsuit against the columnist, the syndicate, and some of their clients; the suit against Creators was quickly dropped.

== Author and hobbyist ==
Newcombe is also an avid weightlifter, pipe collector, and writer. He contributed to the 1983 book The Businessman's Minutes-A-Day Guide to Shaping Up, by former champion bodybuilder and Italian actor Dr. Franco Columbu. He has been lifting weights for most of his life and entered a bodybuilding contest in 1986, placing third in the AAU Mr. Los Angeles Contest. He has been featured in Muscle & Fitness magazine. He wrote the book In Search of Pipe Dreams (2003), which was translated into Mandarin and German, titled Der Traum vom Pfeifenrauchen in German (translation: The Dream of Pipe Smoking) (2007). He also wrote Still Searching for Pipe Dreams in 2010.

In 2012, Newcombe contributed to the books Scandinavian Pipemakers, by Jan Andersson, and Shoulder Pain? the Solution and Prevention, by Dr. John Kirsch. He also contributed to the Chinese book, An Ivarsson Product: Three Generations of Ivarsson by Xu Hai, which was published in 2015. His latest book, The Magic of Lifting Weights, was published in 2021 and is featured in a short documentary on YouTube, "A Bodybuilder for Life."
