= List of fictional dogs in comics =

This is a list of fictional dogs in comics and is a subsidiary to the list of fictional dogs. It is a collection of various dogs in comics.

== Comics ==
Name	Breed	Series	Creator	Notes
Ace the Bat-Hound	German Shepherd	Batman	Bob Kane	Bruce Wayne's dog.
Adolp	Dachshund	Dinglehoofer und His Dog	Harold Knerr	Dinglehoofer's dog. In 1936 the dog was renamed Schnappsy to avoid connotations with Adolf Hitler.
Akamaru	Great Pyrenees	Naruto (Japanese manga)	Masashi Kishimoto	Kiba Inuzuka's ninja dog.
Alec	Generic	Alec the Great	Edwina Dumm	
Alexander	Great Pyrenees	Fullmetal Alchemist (Japanese manga)	Hiromu Arakawa	Nina Tucker's dog.
Albert		Albert	Klaus Vonderwerth	
Alonzo		Have You Seen Alonzo?	Ralph Yardley, Paul Terry, John Terry, Mike Randall, Tam, Jim Navoni and Herbert Morton Stoops.	
Alphonse	English Setter	Luc Junior	René Goscinny and Albert Uderzo.	Luc's faithful dog.
The Angriest Dog in the World	Unknown	The Angriest Dog in the World	David Lynch.	An angry black dog stuck in one position, tied to a pole.
Andy	St. Bernard	Mark Trail	Ed Dodd	Mark's faithful dog.
Andy	close to a Chihuahua or a Dachshund	Pearls Before Swine	Stephan Pastis	A chained up dog who has big plans for the future, and also sadly was ditched by his girlfriend and lost his father
Axel	Generic	The Fusco Brothers	J. C. Duffy	Dog belonging to four brothers
Bailey	Mixed breed Labradoodle	Bliss	Harry Bliss.	A dog proficient in many things.
Bandit	Labrador Retriever	We3	Grant Morrison and Frank Quitely.	One of the three protagonists.
Banks	Mixed breed	Barkeater Lake	Corey Pandolph	
Barfy	Labrador Retriever	Family Circus	Bil Keane	The first family dog.
Barnabas	Unknown	The Sandman: Brief Lives	Neil Gaiman, Jill Thompson	A talking dog who is the companion of Destruction and Delirium.
Bars	Bulldog	Franka	Henk Kuijpers.	The puppy bulldog of Franka.
Beagle Boys	Beagle	Donald Duck	Carl Barks	A gang of criminals who constantly try to rob Scrooge McDuck.
Bean	Generic	Little Jimmy	Jimmy Swinnerton	Jimmy's dog
Beaumont	Sheepdog	Pooch Cafe	Paul Gilligan	Bartender of Pooch Café.
Beauregard Bugleboy	Bloodhound	Pogo	Walt Kelly	
Beck	Generic	Beck (Japanese manga)	Harold Sakuishi	Ryusuke's dog; about a teenage boy and his pursuit of a music career.
Becquerel	White Swiss Shepherd Dog	Homestuck	Andrew Hussie	The first guardian of Pre-Scratch Earth. Jade Harley's guardian and pet.
Bee	Labrador Retriever	Dragon Ball	Akira Toriyama	A stray and injured dog found by Majin Buu. Bee is healed by Buu, and the two start a friendship. Bee ends up becoming adopted by Mr. Satan.
Bello	White Fox Terrier	De Avonturen Van Bello	Marten Toonder	Main protagonist in a short-lived 1939 Dutch comic strip.
Bello	Blue dog	Bussi Bär	Rolf Kauka	The blue dog of Bussi Bär.
Belvedere	Generic	Belvedere	George Webster Crenshaw	Pet of Orville and Emma, an intelligent and spoiled dog who causes many problems for his family.
Bessy	Rough Collie	Bessy (Belgian)	Willy Vandersteen	Main character in a long-running Belgian western comics series. In the franchise he is the pet of Andy.
Big Shirley	Generic	Cul de Sac	Richard Thompson	Alice's Grandmother's dog
Bill	Cocker Spaniel	Boule et Bill	Jean Roba	Boule's dog.
Bingo	Fox Terrier	Rupert Bear	Alfred Bestall	Friend of Rupert.
Biscuit	Generic	Stone Soup	Jan Eliot	Holly and Alix's dog.
Bitsy	Generic	Marvin	Tom Armstrong	The family dog.
Black Bob	Border Collie	Black Bob	Jack Prout	Comic strip published in The Dandy. Shepherd master Andrew Glenn's dog.
Black Hayate	Unknown	Fullmetal Alchemist	Hiromu Arakawa	Riza Hawkeye's dog.
Blake	Generic	Little Dee (webcomic)	Christopher Baldwin	About a little girl lost in the woods who is befriended by three talking animals.
Bleeker	Robotic	The Rechargeable Dog	Jonathan Mahood	Skip's robotic dog.
Blu	Miniature Schnauzer	Monica's Gang (Brazilian)	Mauricio de Sousa	Franklin's pet.
Bobje	Generic	Bert	Kamagurka	Bert's tiny anthropomorphized dog; used as mascot for the Flemish magazine HUMO in the 1990s.
Bobosse	Generic	Bobosse	Marcel Remacle.	Protagonist in a 1956–1958 humor comic.
Boby	Generic	Boby	Sifre	A blue puppy dog.
Bolivar	St. Bernard	Donald Duck	Al Taliaferro	Donald's pet and often a nuisance to him.
Bond	Great Pyrenees	Spy × Family	Tatsuya Endo	Anya's dog, adopted after his precognition ability helped stop a terrorist plot.
Bonzo the Dog	Mixed breed	Bonzo the dog	George E. Studdy	A little puppy who often appeared in comics and ads in the 1920s. Later inspired the name of the Bonzo Dog Band.
Boomer	Generic	Pooch Cafe	Paul Gilligan	Poncho's friend.
Boot	Old English Sheepdog	The Perishers (British)	Maurice Dodd	
Bowser	Generic	Moose & Molly	Bob Weber	
Böwser vön Überdog	Bulldog	The Ongoing Adventures of Rocket Llama	Alex Langley and Nick Langley	Primary antagonist.
Bradley	Generic	On a Claire Day	Henry Beckett and Carla Ventresca	Claire Bennett's pet.
Brainy Barker	Saluki	Krypto the Superdog		A dog-like alien who is a member of the Dog Star Patrol and possesses telekinetic powers. She was originally created for the animated series Krypto the Superdog and also appeared in the series' tie-in comic.
Bridget T. Dog	Generic	My Cage	Melissa DeJesus and Ed Power	Manga inspired comic about a world of anthropomorphic animals.
Brigadier Snuf	Generic	Tom Poes (Dutch)	Marten Toonder	Second most important police officer, after Bulle Bas.
Brutacroc	Generic	Le Club des Peur-de-Rien	Tibet	The guard dog of this children's gang.
Buckles	Generic	Buckles	David Gilbert	A guileless and innocent dog.
Bul Super	Bulldog	Tom Poes (Dutch)	Marten Toonder	An anthropomorphic bulldog who acts as a major crook in the series. He is usually seen together with his cronie, Hiep Hieper.
Bulle Bas	Bulldog	Tom Poes (Dutch)	Marten Toonder	Anthropomorphic police chief who always suspects Olivier B. Bommel of any possible crime and wants to arrest him.
Bullet	Generic	Barney Google and Snuffy Smith	Billy DeBeck	Snuffy's dog.
Bulletdog	English Setter	Bulletman	Bill Parker and Jon Smalle.	Bulletman's dog.
Bumper	Bulldog	The Middletons	Ralph Dunagin and Dana Summers	The family dog.
Bumper	Beagle	Zap & Bumper	Rob Wighman	Zap's dog.
Buster	Generic	Oh, Brother	Bob Weber Jr. and Jay Stephens	About the daily interaction between two young siblings, Lily and Bud, and their dog.
Butch	Generic	Moose and Molly	Bob Weber	
Cacá	Unknown	Cacá e sua Turma	Ely Barbosa	Lili and Dentinho's pet.
Cagney	Boston Terrier	Zack Hill	John Deering	Zack's pet.
Canturro	Generic	Gaturro	Cristian Dzwonik	A character in the Argentine comic strip.
Chalk	Generic	Dr. Stone	Riichiro Inagaki and Boichi	Suika's dog.
Chief Mutt	Bulldog	Slylock Fox & Comics for Kids	Bob Weber Jr.	
Le Chien de Berger (The Shepherd's Dog)	Otterhound	Le Génie des Alpages	F'Murr	The nameless shepherd's dog who is able to walk on two feet and converse in intelligent and philosophical conversations.
Chibi	St. Bernard	Itazura na Kiss	Kaoru Tada	
Chubb and Chauncey	Generic	Chubb and Chauncey	Vance Rodewall	About one lower class dog and one more refined.
Cirano	Bloodhound	Alan Ford (Italian)	Max Bunker	Bob Rock's dog
Clive	Generic	My Own Genie	Jamie Smart	Lula's pet, who is given the power of speech by Genie.
Cobb and Ruppert	Generic	Deflocked	Jeff Corriveau	Two sheep dogs who are brothers.
Cody	Generic	U.S. Acres	Jim Davis	A dog who liked to chase barnyard animals.
Colin Curly	Generic	Colin Curly	created for advertising by Bob Lawrie	A comic book following success as advertising icon for Quavers, a British snack food.
Cosmo the Spacedog	Golden Retriever	Guardians of the Galaxy	Dan Abnett and Andy Lanning	
Cubitus (Wowser)	Old English Sheepdog	Cubitus	Dupa	Semaphore's (Professor Ding's) obese anthropomorphic dog.
Daisy	Generic	Blondie	Chic Young	The family dog.
Danny	Great Dane	JoJo's Bizarre Adventure: Phantom Blood	Hirohiko Araki	The dog belonging to Jonathan Joestar. He is killed by Dio Brando, which ignites the generational feud between the Joestar family and Dio.
Dawg	Generic	Hi and Lois	Mort Walker and Dik Browne	The family dog.
Ditto	Cavalier King Charles Spaniel	Monica's Gang	Mauricio de Sousa	Monica's dog.
DJ Dog	Pit Bull	Housebroken'	Steve Watkins	A rap artist dog who lives with the Watson family.
Dog	Border Collie	Footrot Flats	Murray Ball	A dog who thinks he's intelligent and tough but is actually soft and cowardly.
Dogbert	Generic	Dilbert	Scott Adams	Dilbert's dog. He wears glasses and is highly intelligent.
Dogmatix (Idefix)	Terrier	Asterix	René Goscinny and Albert Uderzo	Obelix's minuscule dog.
Dogpool	Mutt	Deadpool Corps	Victor Gischler and Philip Bond	Deadpool from a different reality and an original member of the Deadpool Corps.
Dogs of C-Kennel (including Iggy, Kenny, Oliver, Tucker, and Will)	Chihuahua, Husky, Great Dane, Schnauzer, and Pit bull	Dogs of C-Kennel	Mick and Mason Mastroianni	Dogs who live in a kennel.
Dollar	Dalmatian	Richie Rich	Alfred Harvey and Warren Kremer	The family dog.
Droolia	Bullmastiff	Pooch Cafe	Paul Gilligan	A female bulldog who is in love with Poo Poo.
Duke	Generic	Kelly & Duke	Jack Moore	Kelly's best friend.
Duncan	Scottish Terrier	Raising Duncan	Chris Browne	a semi-autobiographical look at the life of the comic's creator.
Earl	Jack Russell Terrier	Mutts	Patrick McDonnell	
Edgar	English Sheepdog	For Better or Worse	Lynn Johnston	The second family dog besides Farley.
Einstein	Generic	Einstein	Jay Heavilin and Frank B. Johnson	Leroy's moustached dog, who is a genius and able to talk with his master.
Electra	Generic	Cathy	Cathy Guisewite	Cathy's dog.
Eugene the Jeep	unknown	Popeye	E.C. Segar	A character presumed to be some type of dog.
Fang	Generic	The Duplex	Glenn McCoy	Eno's dog.
Farley	English Sheepdog	For Better or Worse	Lynn Johnston	The first family dog before Edgar.
Fergus	Generic	Citizen Dog	Mark O'Hare	Mel's dog.
Fifi	Poodle	Jommeke	Jef Nys	Dog of the Countess Elodie from Stiepelteen, who is so large that she can ride him like a horse.
Fikske		Rikske en Fikske	Nonkel Fons and Gray Croucher	The naughty dog of the boy Rikske. Both were mascots of the Belgian children's magazine Zonnekind.
Flico	Poodle	Pat et Moune	François Bel	Pat and Moune's dog.
Fluffy	Lhasa Apso	Monica's Gang	Mauricio de Sousa	Jimmy Five's dog.
Fokkie Flink	Generic	nl:Fokkie Flink	Joop Geesink, Henk Zwart, Henk de Wolf	Anthropomorphic black and white dog who solves crimes.
Foo Foo	Poodle	Dennis the Menace and Gnasher	David Law	The dog of Walter Brown, the nice neighbourhood kid.
Fred Bassett	Basset Hound	Fred Basset	Alex Graham	About a snobbish dog who appreciates the finer qualities of life.
Fritz	Dachshund	The Adventures of Jane	Norman Pett	Jane's dog.
Fuzz	Generic	Ziggy	Tom Wilson	Ziggy's dog.
Gai-Luron	Basset Hound	Gai-Luron (French)	Marcel Gotlib	Melancholic dog.
Geddown		The Flibbertys	Ray Helle	The dog of Stan and Fran Flibberty.
Gilbert	unspecified	Julien Boisvert	Michel Plessix	Julien's dog.
Goofy	unspecified	Walt Disney comics	Walt Disney	
Gin	Akita	Ginga: Nagareboshi Gin (Japanese)	Yoshihiro Takahashi	Daisuke's dog who joins a pack of wild dogs to fight a deranged bear and his minions.
Gnasher	Abyssinian wire-haired tripe hound	Dennis the Menace and Gnasher	David Law	Dennis' dog and an accomplice to his pranks.
Gnipper	Abyssinian wire-haired tripe hound (British)	Gnasher and Gnipper	David Law	Gnasher's puppy.
Grimm	Bull Terrier	Mother Goose and Grimm	Mike Peters	A talking dog owned by Mother Goose.
Gromit	Generic	Wallace and Gromit	Nick Park	Wallace's very clever dog.
Constable Growler	Bulldog	Rupert Bear	Alfred Bestall	The local policeman.
Gumbo	Mixed breed	Adam@home	Brian Basset, Rob Harrell	The family dog who was added to the family in October 2012.
Gus	Scottish Terrier	Pooch Cafe	Paul Gilligan	
Halley	Unknown	Homestuck	Andrew Hussie	One component of Becquerel's genetic makeup. Grandpa Harley's pet.
Hank	Corgi	Astro City	Kurt Busiek and Mike Norton	Combines with his owner Andy to become the superhero G-Dog, thanks to a magic amulet.
Happie	Akita dog	Stargazing Dog	Takashi Murakami	A Japanese manga
Harrie	Generic	Joop Klepzeiker	Eric Schreurs	Joop Klepzeiker's dog.
Harry	West Highland White Terrier	Oor Wullie	Published in the D.C. Thomson newspaper The Sunday Post	Wullie's dog.
Hellhound	Unknown	Beyblade: Metal (series)	Takafumi Adachi	Myreille Psychiokieus's vicious dog beyblade.
Hiep Hieper	Generic	Tom Poes (Dutch)	Marten Toonder	Tiny sidekick and criminal associate of Bul Super.
Homeless Hector	Generic	Homeless Hector	Harry Hershfield	Humoristic adventures of a stray dog.
Hot Dog	Generic	Archie	Bob Montana	Jughead's dog.
Howard Huge	St. Bernard	Howard Huge	Bunny Hoest, John Reiner	An oversized family dog.
Hudson	Beagle	Pooch Cafe	Paul Gilligan	Poncho's friend. Well-meaning but naïve.
Humphrey	Generic	Superkatt	Dan Gordon	An anthropomorphic cat who wears a bowtie, bonnet, and diaper as a superhero costume.
Iggy	Boston Terrier	JoJo's Bizarre Adventure: Stardust Crusaders	Hirohiko Araki	Iggy's a stray Boston Terrier with a supernatural power called a Stand. He is recruited by the Joestars half-way through the story to help defeat DIO.
Jade Harley	Human/Unknown	Homestuck	Andrew Hussie	The first guardian of Pre-Scratch Earth. Jade Harley's dreamself, guardian, pet and ghost. Absorbed by Jade when she godtiered.
Jigg and Mooch	Generic	Jigg and Mooch	John Stanley	About a large dog, Jiff, and a small dog, Mooch, romping around.
Jock	Scottish Terrier	Fred Basset	Alex Graham	Fred's companion.
Jollipop	White Labrador	Panda (Dutch)	Marten Toonder	Panda's loyal and very formal butler.
Joost	White Labrador	Tom Poes (Dutch)	Marten Toonder	Bommel's loyal and very formal butler.
Junior	Generic	Muggs and Skeeter	Wally Bishop	The family dog.
Kemlo "Hyperdog" Caesar, Sergeant	Doberman	Top 10	Alan Moore, Gene Ha and Zander Cannon	An intelligent, talking dog in a robotic exoskeleton.
Kewpie	Generic	The Born Loser	Art Sansom	The family dog.
King	Alaskan Malamute	Challenge of the Yukon	Fran Striker and George W. Trendle	The sled dog of St. Preston.
Kirik	Unknown	Panji Koming	Dwi Koendoro	The dog of Mbah the hermit.
Kleine	Doberman Pinscher	Gasoline Alley	Dick Moores	One of the family dogs.
Koko	Border Collie	The Other Coast	Adrian Raeside	One of the family dogs.
Koko the Pup	English bulldog	Koko the Pup	Edgar Henry Banger	Anthropomorphic dog in a gag comics series, published by DC Thomson between 1939 and 1941.
Kolin Kelly	Generic	Krazy Kat	George Herriman	A brickmaker.
Kreeg	Mixed breed	Sojourn	Mark Alessi, Gina M. Villa, Ron Marz, Ian Edginton, Greg Land	Arwyn's dog.
Krypto	Generic	Superman	Jerry Siegel, Joe Shuster	Superman's dog who, like Superman, comes from the planet Krypton and possesses similar abilities to him.
Lambão	Unknown	Turma da Fofura	Ely Barbosa	Nenê's pet.
Little Dog	Generic	Little Dog Lost	Steve Boreman	About a long-lost dog who enjoys the adventure of the open road.
Lockjaw	Bulldog	Fantastic Four	Stan Lee, Jack Kirby	An Inhuman bulldog who can teleport.
Lotje	Teckle	Jan, Jans en de Kinderen	Jan Kruis	Despite its feminine name a male dog and one of the family's pets.
Louie	Generic	Overboard	Chip Dunham	Captain Crow's pet.
Lucky	Generic	Hawkeye		Barton's dog.
Mammoth Mutt	Chihuahua	Superboy	Jerry Siegel	A dog who can inflate her body enormously.
Marmaduke	Great Dane	Marmaduke	Brad Anderson	The Winslow family's oversized dog.
Max	Generic	Lola	Todd Clark	Lola's pet.
Max	Golden Retriever	Max	Daniel Shelton	Ben's pet.
Metal	Tibetan Mastiff	Tibetan Rock Dog (Chinese)	Zheng Jun	A meditating and orphaned dog who grows up in a Buddhist temple.
Mike	Generic	Ginger Meggs	Jimmy_Bancks	Ginger's dog in the most widely syndicated Australian comic strip.
Miles	Generic	Farley	Phil Frank	A mild-mannered dog host of KFUR, a radio station for dogs and cats.
Mortimer	Mixed breed	Jump Start	Robb Armstrong	The Cobb family dog.
Nabuko Donosor	Alien dog	Urbanus (Flemish)	Urbanus and Willy Linthout	A yellow dog whose front head and upper jaw float above his lower jaw and the rest of his body. He wears slippers on his feet and is able to talk. In reality he is member of a species called the Hittentits, but Urbanus adopted him as his dog.
Napoleon	Irish Wolfhound	Napoleon and Uncle Elby	Clifford McBride	Uncle Elby's dog, who was based on the pet of the creator' uncle.
Newshounds	Golden Retriever	Newshounds	Thomas K. Dye	The staff of news broadcasting company, KPET.
Nosonja		Alan Ford	Max Bunker and Magnus.	Number One's dog
Nugget	Unknown (possibly a Jack Russell or Fox Terrier)	Adventures of the Big Boy	Stan Lee, Bill Everett, Sol Brodsky and Dan DeCarlo	Big Boy's dog, who has the ability to think in human language.
Odie	Generic	Garfield	Jim Davis	Utterly dim-witted, constantly drooling yellow dog of Jon Arbuckle and frequent target of Garfield's sarcasm.
Offissa Bull Pup	Bulldog	Krazy Kat	George Herriman	Police dog who has a soft spot for Krazy Kat and often arrests Ignatz the Mouse whenever he throws a brick at Krazy Kat.
Oso	Pug	Sheldon	Dave Kellett	Sheldon's dog.
Otto	Generic	Beetle Bailey	Mort Walker	Sergeant Snorkel's pet who wears the same military uniform as him.
Pajamas	Generic	Tumbleweeds	Tom K. Ryan	A lazy dog.
Pal	Airedale terrier	Gasoline Alley	Frank O. King	Gifted to Skeezix Wallet (adopted son of Walt Wallet) by dear sweet elderly Mother Wallet.
Patch	Cocker Spaniel	Mandy	British comic book magazine for girls	Mandy's dog
Patches	Generic	Gamin and Patches	Mort Walker	The moustached dog of the street urchin Gamin.
Pearl	Unspecified	Beryl the Peril	David Law	Beryl's dog.
Pekkie	Poodle	Jommeke	Jef Nys	The black poodle of the character Filiberke, who is Jommeke's best friend.
Picpak	Generic	Picpak Dog Comics	Kim Belding	Pick pooch and star of strip
Pif (Spiff in English)	Generic	Spiff and Hercules (French: Pif et Hercule)	José Cabrero Arnal	Anthropomorphic dog. Inspired his own magazine: Pif Gadget.
Pimpa	Red spotted white dog	Pimpa (Italian)	Francesco Tullio Altan	A talking dog who lives in a magical world.
Pip	Generic	Pip, Squeak and Wilfred (British)	Bertram Lamb and Austin Bowen Payne	
Polgas	Generic	Pugad Baboy (Filipino)	Pol Medina, Jr.	Sungcals' anthropomorphic family dog.
Poncho	Generic	Pooch Cafe	Paul Gilligan	Chazz's dog.
Pong Ping	Pekinese	Rupert Bear	Alfred Bestall	Friend of Rupert.
Ponta Koizumi	Labrador Retriever	Guru Guru Pon-chan (Japanese)	Satomi Ikezawa	A puppy who turns into a human and falls in love with a girl in his school.
Poo Poo	Bichon Frise	Pooch Cafe	Paul Gilligan	Poncho's friend, who has trouble with his masculinity because he's a poodle.
Pooch	Generic	Sinfest	Tatsuyada Ishida	A stereotypical cheerful dog.
Pooch	German Shepherd	Our Fighting Forces	Robert Kanigher and Jerry Grandenetti	Soldier and companion of Gunner and Sarge
Poochie	Generic	Nancy	Ernie Bushmiller	Nancy's dog.
Poussif	Dalmatian	Poussin et Poussif	René Goscinny and Albert Uderzo.	A Dalmatian dog who has to guard a little baby, Poussin, and bring him back to safety whenever he crawls out of the house.
Puddles	Generic	Luann	Greg Evans	Luann's dog.
Puddy	Generic	Eva	published by St. John Publications	about a high-spirited little girl with a vivid imagination
Algy Pug	Pug	Rupert Bear	Mary Tourtel	A good friend of Rupert.
Pup	Generic	Pogo	Walt Kelly	
Puppie	Generic	Elsje (Lizzy)	Gerben Valkema	
Pup Parade dogs	Generic	Pup Parade (British)	Gordon Bell	Dog-versions of Leo Baxendale's The Bash Street Kids, originally published in The Beano.
Radar	Unknown	Supreme	Rob Liefeld	A super-powered dog.
Rantanplan	Generic	Lucky Luke (French-Belgian)	Morris	A dumb prison guard dog who watches over the Dalton brothers or assists Lucky Luke in tracking them down when they escape. In both cases he is easily fooled and never understands what is going on? Jolly Jumper loathes him.
Retep	Fictional breed	Retic	Eric Schreurs	A pink anthropomorphic dog with a grumpy nature.
Rex the Wonder Dog	German Shepherd	Rex the Wonder Dog	Robert Kanigher and Alex Toth	A dog who gets an injection of a special serum giving him strength, speed and intelligence in fighting evil.
Rivets	Generic	Rivets	George Sixta	The family dog; the strip first appeared in The Saturday Evening Post in 1944.
Rocket	Generic	Chacha Chaudhary (Indian)	Pran Kumar Sharma	Chacha Chaudhary's dog.
Rocky	Generic	Rocky (Swedish)	Martin Kellerman	An anthropomorphic dog.
Rodney	Sheep Dog	Trudy	Jerry Marcus	The family dog
Roscoe	Generic	Pickles	Brian Crane	Earl and Opal's dog.
Rosebud	Basselope (a cross between a basset hound and an antelope)	Bloom County	Berkeley Breathed	The world's last basselop
Rover	Labrador Retriever	Red and Rover	Brian Basset	Red's loyal companion.
Ruff	Briard	Dennis the Menace (U.S. comic)	Hank Ketcham	The family dog.
Rufferto	Generic	Groo the Wanderer	Sergio Aragonés	Groo's inseparable companion.
Sakura	Papillon	The Other Coast	Adrian Raeside	One of the family dogs.
Sam	Cocker Spaniel	Family Circus	Bill Keane	The second family dog.
Sam	Irish Wolfhound	Sam & Max	Steve Purcell	A clever six-foot detective dog who wears a suit and a fedora.
Sando	Dachshund	Lancelot	Willy Vandersteen	Lancelot's dog.
Sandy	Airedale	Little Orphan Annie	Harold Gray	Annie's dog.
Sapphie	Cavalier King Charles Spaniel	Jewelpet	Atsushi Maekawa, Tomoko Miyakawa	Aoi's pet.
Satchel Pooch	Shar Pei/Yellow Labrador Retriever cross	Get Fuzzy	Darby Conley	One of Rob's pets.
Scamp	Mixed breed	Scamp	Walt Disney	Pup of the Tramp in Lady and the Tramp. Received his own comics series, despite only featuring for five minutes in the original motion picture.
Schultz	Great Dane	Sweetie Pie	Nadine Seltzer	Sweetie Pie's dog; about a typical kid who can be quite annoying to her parents and teacher.
Señor Dog	Chihuahua	Gordo	Gus Arriola	Gordo's dog, a Mexican bean farmer who becomes a tour guide.
Shagg E. Dawg	Generic	Ask Shagg	Peter Guren	A dog answering readers' questions about other animals.
Sieg	Great Dane	Gasoline Alley	Dick Moores	One of the family dogs.
Sinbad	Terrier	Sinbad Again	Edwina Dumm	About the dog, his young boy owner, and his grandmother.
Skip	Samoyed	Kapitein Rob	Pieter J. Kuhn	Kapitein Rob's dog whom he rescued from a sinking German ship near Murmansk.
Smirnov	German Shepherd	Blacksad	Juan Díaz Canales and Juanjo Guarnido	Police commissioner and friend of Blacksad.
Snert	Generic	Hägar the Horrible	Dik Browne	Hägar's dog, who wears a Viking helmet like his master.
Sniffy	Beagle	Sniffy	George Fett	(Not Sniffy the Pup) About a gang of neighborhood dogs, including Sniffy; 1964–1973.
Sniffy the Pup	Generic	Sniffy the Pup	Appeared in Standard Comics publications	A playful and frolicking pup; 1949–1953
Snoopy	Beagle	Peanuts	Charles M. Schulz	Charlie Brown's eccentric dog who often delves into his own fantasies. Sleeps on top of his dog house, which harbors more space inside than would assume from looking at it from the outside. Has an infamous bizarre dance too.
Snowy	Wire Fox Terrier	The Adventures of Tintin	Hergé	Tintin's pet.
Sophie	Labrador Retriever	Dog eat Doug	Brian Anderson	Doug's canine friend.
Sorry O-O	Generic	Moomin	Tove Jansson	A melancholic dog.
Sparky	Dalmatian	Smoky Stover	Bill Holman (cartoonist)	Smokey's firehouse dog (sometimes called Sparks).
Spencer	Labrador Retriever	Best in Show	Phil Juliano	A wily dog with a mind of his own.
Spike	Bulldog	Peanuts	Charles M. Schulz	Snoopy's older brother.
Spike	Bulldog	Heathcliff	George Gately	A neighbor's dog.
Spot	Generic	The Timbertoes	John Gee	The dog in a family of wooden characters.
Steenbreek	Generic	Tom Poes (Dutch)	Marten Toonder	Anthropomorphic white dog who is a secretary in the local city government. https://www.lambiek.net/artists/t/toonder.htm
Streak (the Wonder Dog)	Generic	Green Lantern	Robert Kanigher, Alex Toth	Canine companion to Green Lantern (Alan Scott).
Struppi		Tobias Seicherl	Ladislaus Kmoch	Canine companion to Tobias, often acting as his voice of reason.
Mr. Tadakichi	Great Pyrenees	Azumanga Daioh	Kiyohiko Azuma	Chiyo Mihama's dog.
Tekko Taks	Black dachshund.	nl:Tekko Taks (Dutch)	Henk Kabos	Anthropomorphic black dog who is a time-traveling detective.
Tige	Pit bull	Buster Brown	Richard Felton Outcault	Buster's dog.
Tippie	Scottish Terrier	Cap Stubbs and Tippie	Edwina Dumm	Cap's dog.
Titus	Great Dane	Batman	Peter Tomasi	Damian Wayne's dog in the comic book series. Titus was introduced in the Batman books as taking the place of Ace the Bat-hound.
Tobias	Generic	Spike and Suzy (Suske en Wiske in Dutch)	Willy Vandersteen	Dog adopted by Wiske.
Tobias	Generic	Jommeke	Jef Nys	Dog of the Baron van Piependale (Baron of Piependale), whom he uses as a horse because of the baron's tiny size.
Top Dog	Generic	Top Dog	Lennie Herman and Warren Kremer	Joey's friend.
Tripod	Unknown	Monroe	Bill Wray	Monroe's blind and three-legged dog.
Tubby	Generic	Take It From The Tinkersons	Bill Bettwy	
Tuffy	Generic	Tuffy and his Magic Tail (also known as Tuffy Our Puppy of Tuffy the Pup)	Arthur Warden	A little dog with a magic tail.
Vivian	Generic	Cathy	Cathy Guisewite	Irving's dog.
Wally	Dachshund	Drabble	Kevin Fagan	The family dog.
Watson	Generic	Kid Sherlock	Justin Phillips	Young Sherlock's companions as they solve minor mysteries.
Weed	Akita	Ginga Legend Weed	Yoshihiro Takahashi	Son of Gin.
Weederman	Generic	Mr. Boffo	Joe Martin	Earl's dog.
Winston	White bulldog	Winston	Jim Burnett and Johnny Sajem.	A white bulldog who wore a bowler hat and who was clearly a reference to Winston Churchill.
Wonder Dog	?	Super Friends	E. Nelson Bridwell	Superhero
Yankee Poodle, aka Rova Barkitt	Poodle	Captain Carrot and His Amazing Zoo Crew	Roy Thomas and Scott Shaw.	
Zero	Generic	Little Annie Rooney	Harold Gray	Annie's dog.
Zuky	Generic	Meebo and Zuky	Laura Howell	Arch-rival of Meebo the dog.

See other fictional dogs at List of fictional dogs.

=== Sources ===
- Some of the prose in this article was copied from http://www.lingerandlook.com/Names/DogsallList.php and related pages, which are available under the Creative Commons Attribution-Share Alike 3.0 Unported license and the GNU Free Documentation License.
