= Comic strip switcheroo =

April Fools' joke where writers and artists traded comic strips

The comic strip switcheroo (also known as the Great Comics Switcheroonie or the Great April Fools' Day Comics Switcheroonie) was held on April 1, 1997, during which several cartoonists, without the foreknowledge of their editors, traded comic strips for that date, in commemoration of April Fools' Day.

== Overview ==
Forty-six syndicated artists participated in the event, which was conceived by Baby Blues creators Rick Kirkman and Jerry Scott. Some of the switches were one for the other, while others worked on the strips in sequence (i.e. one author would work on another author's strip, and that strip's regular author would work on another strip, continuing in this way until the sequence ends with the final traded strip). Additionally, Drabble creator Kevin Fagan drew the strip with his non-dominant hand, while Greg Howard and Craig MacIntosh assumed each other's respective roles for the date's Sally Forth strip. Charles M. Schulz (Peanuts) and Patrick McDonnell (Mutts) were slated to do each other's strips, but ultimately did not participate because the former reportedly doubted the idea's viability. Each artist was permitted to take liberties with the strip they worked on.

The one-day experiment proved to be a success, garnering some publicity and being a harmless yet amusing prank played on the newspapers, the readers, and the comic syndicates.

While characters making guest appearances in other comic strips is not uncommon, this event was the most ambitious in scale. A similar phenomenon persists in webcomics, where Internet cartoonists occasionally do the other's series.

=== Similar events ===
The Arlo and Janis strip for April 1, 1998, references the event; the first two panels are blank, with the last two panels comprising Janis telling Arlo that no such similar event would take place in 1998 and Arlo informing her that Dagwood Bumstead "misunderstood entirely".

The FoxTrot strip for April 1, 2001, also references the event; in that strip, Paige Fox reminisces about the switcheroo, as characters from other strips make appearances in FoxTrot's style, briefly taking Jason's place, followed by members of the Fox family appearing in the styles of other strips. The strips thus referenced include Cathy, Hägar the Horrible, The Boondocks, Doonesbury, Baby Blues, and Calvin and Hobbes.

On April 1, 2005, Stephan Pastis (Pearls Before Swine), Bill Amend (FoxTrot), and Darby Conley (Get Fuzzy) each drew similar strips revolving around Ouija boards; the three strips have largely similar dialogue and punchlines.

On April 1, 2016, at least fifty webcomics, including Cyanide & Happiness, The Awkward Yeti, and Poorly Drawn Lines, all ran similar dialogue; the comics revolved around a subject having a bucket of water dumped on them, said subject criticizing the stunt as "unoriginal", and the originator of the prank reflecting that "perhaps... [they] were the fool". The participating artists also jokingly accused each other of plagiarism.

On April 1, 2021, Olivia Jaimes of Nancy and Steenz of Heart of the City swapped strips for that date.

== Strips and creators involved ==
The comics featured in the event were done as follows:

13-way swap

- Baby Blues was drawn by Stephen Bentley (Herb and Jamaal): The MacPhersons are depicted as Black in a strip where Darryl says that "every question [was not] as easy as black and white".
- Herb and Jamaal was drawn by Russel Myers (Broom-Hilda).
- Broom-Hilda was drawn by Bud Grace (Ernie).
- Ernie was drawn by J. C. Duffy (The Fusco Brothers).
- The Fusco Brothers was drawn by Jerry Van Amerongen (Ballard Street).
- Ballard Street was drawn by Mell Lazarus (Momma).
- Momma was done by Jeff Millar and Bill Hinds (Tank McNamara): Marylou introduces Momma to Tank, Marylou's new boyfriend.
- Tank McNamara was drawn by Chip Sansom (The Born Loser).
- The Born Loser was drawn by Brian Crane (Pickles): Earl joins Thorney on a walk through a neighborhood.
- Pickles was drawn by Michael Jantze (The Norm): Earl is really Norm in a costume.
- The Norm was drawn by Bill Holbrook (On the Fastrack): Wendy visits Norm's workplace.
- On the Fastrack was drawn by Jim Toomey (Sherman's Lagoon): Part of Wendy's hair sticks out while she swims, causing onlookers to mistake her for a shark.
- Sherman's Lagoon was done by Kirkman and Scott (Baby Blues): A family of fish resembling the MacPhersons search for a babysitter; Megan sees this as an opportunity to eat them.

11-way swap

- 9 Chickweed Lane was drawn by Chris Browne (Hägar the Horrible): Lucky Eddie was one of Amos' ancestors.
- Hägar the Horrible was drawn by Wiley Miller (Non Sequitur): Hägar is visited by a systems analyst.
- Non Sequitur was drawn by Robb Armstrong (Jump Start).
- Jump Start was done by Walker and Browne (Hi and Lois): Joe and Marcy see themselves like Hi and Lois.
- Hi and Lois was drawn by Greg Evans (Luann): Luann is Trixie's babysitter.
- Luann was drawn by Dan Piraro (Bizarro): Luann sees a cartoon chihuahua named Squeeky in her mirror, while she herself slowly transforms into a cockroach.
- Bizarro was drawn by Bill Griffith (Zippy the Pinhead): One of the women in the strip is played by Zippy.
- Zippy the Pinhead was drawn by Bill Amend (FoxTrot): Zippy and Griffy have Jason and Peter's respective faces and are accompanied by Quincy the Iguana.
- FoxTrot was done by Guy and Brad Gilchrist (Nancy): Jason (as Luke Skywalker) is fighting Darth Vader, who reveals himself to be Nancy.
- Nancy was drawn by Pat Brady (Rose Is Rose): Nancy pretends to sing for a crowd of animals, the actual vocals being those of a flock of birds.
- Rose Is Rose was drawn by Brooke McEldowney (9 Chickweed Lane).

9-way swap

- Beattie Blvd. was drawn by Ted Martin (Pavlov).
- Pavlov was drawn by Vic Lee (I Need Help).
- I Need Help was drawn by Lincoln Peirce (Big Nate).
- Big Nate was drawn by Scott Stantis (The Buckets).
- The Buckets was drawn by Jan Eliot (Stone Soup).
- Stone Soup was drawn by Glenn McCoy (The Duplex): Val and Joan discuss their comic being drawn by a man (McCoy) instead of a woman (Eliot).
- The Duplex was done by Delainey and Rasmussen (Betty).
- Betty was drawn by Dave Whamond (Reality Check).
- Reality Check was drawn by Bruce Beattie (Beattie Blvd).

2-way swaps

- Barney Google and Snuffy Smith was drawn by Hank Ketcham (Dennis the Menace): Dennis "helps" Jughaid with a "kick me" sign, and Elviney and Lowezey resemble Alice and Mrs. Wilson.
  - Dennis the Menace was drawn by Fred Lasswell (Barney Google and Snuffy Smith): The Dennis the Menace characters dress like those of Snuffy Smith for a group photo.
- Beetle Bailey was drawn by Jeff MacNelly (Shoe): Skyler is stationed at Camp Swampy; his roommate is Beetle, who writes in a letter to his parents that "some of our recruits really are birdbrains".
  - Shoe was drawn by Mort Walker (Beetle Bailey): Shoe beats up Cosmo as Sgt. Snorkel would Beetle.
- Blondie was drawn by Jim Davis (Garfield): Garfield eats one of Dagwood Bumstead's characteristic sandwiches.
  - Garfield was done by Young and Drake (Blondie): Jon and Garfield stay with the Bumsteads while their paint dries.
- Dilbert was drawn by Bil Keane (The Family Circus): Billy visits Dilbert's cubicle and references The Family Circus's basic concept.
  - The Family Circus was drawn by Scott Adams (Dilbert): Thel has the Pointy-haired Boss's hairstyle and Dogbert is her consultant.
- For Better or For Worse was drawn by Mike Peters (Mother Goose and Grimm): John and Elly Patterson's lines are swapped with those of Mother Goose and Grimm.
  - Mother Goose and Grimm was drawn by Lynn Johnston (For Better or For Worse): Edgar sneaks away to visit a bar, where he talks to Grimm about his issues; Mother Goose and a cat are also at the bar.
- One Big Happy was drawn by Dave Coverly (Speed Bump).
  - Speed Bump was drawn by Rick Detorie (One Big Happy): Ruthie and her family are in the background.

Other notes:

- Kevin Fagan drew Drabble with his left hand instead of his right.
- The artist (Craig MacIntosh) and writer (Greg Howard) of Sally Forth switched roles for the date; Howard originally drew Sally Forth in addition to writing the strip.

== See also ==
- Détournement
- Swipe (comics)
