= Leigh Rubin =

American cartoonist

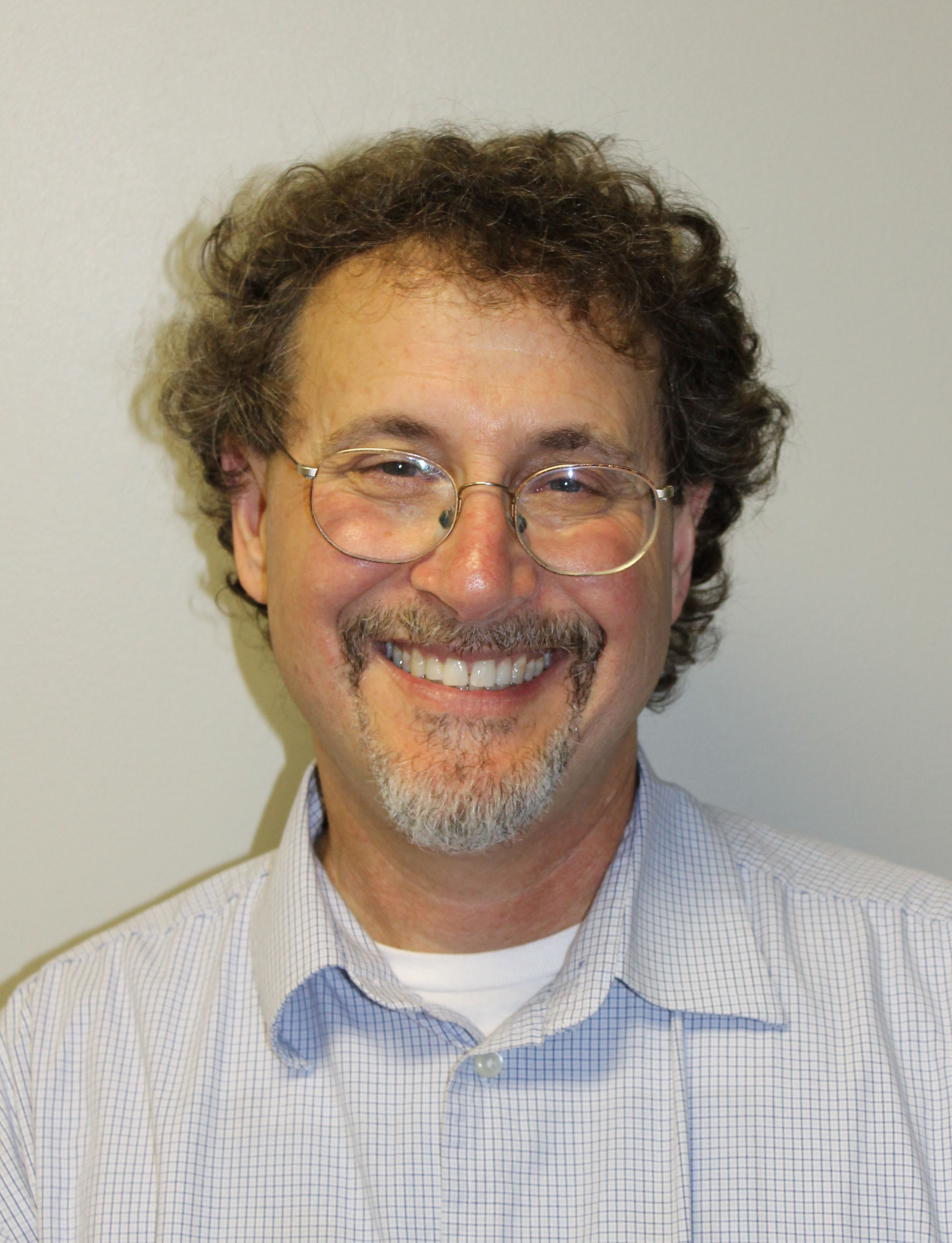
- Leigh Rubin in June 2011
- Born: Queens, New York City
- Area: Cartoonist
- Notable works: Rubes

Signature
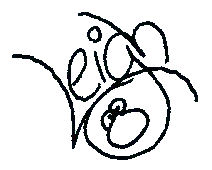

Leigh Rubin is an American comics writer, and is the creator of the syndicated comic strip Rubes.

== Life ==
Born in the Queens borough of New York City, Rubin moved to California at age three. Rubin's parents sold advertising and by the early 70s, he was working in the family print shop.

In 1978 he started his own greeting card company, Rubes Publications, featuring early renditions of his animal characters. He designed a greeting card series with characters who took the shape of musical notes and later published his first cartoon collection, Notable Quotes, in 1981.

In 1984, Steven Hendrickson, entertainment editor for the Antelope Valley Press, Palmdale, California, approached Rubin about writing a daily comic for the paper. After illustrating about 100 cartoons, he began pitching major and minor syndicates. Rubes has been distributed by Creators Syndicate since 1989 and now appears in more than 400 newspapers worldwide.

Leigh also enjoys a busy schedule giving thought-provoking and entertaining cartoon presentations at conferences, as well as professional organizations all around the country. In September 2018 Leigh Rubin had the honor of being selected as Rochester Institute of Technology's first Cartoonist-in Residence. Leigh's first visit as the Cartoonist-in-Residence was in November 2018 where he lectured and taught classes on creativity, and imagination as well as addressing the business aspects of cartooning, branding, and syndication. Rochester Institute of Technology and the Rochester Democrat and Chronicle also hosted the East Coast premiere of Drawing Inspiration, a docu-reality series which celebrates creativity, inspiration and innovation he co-created with filmmaker and special effects fabricator Ryan Johnson to a packed house on the RIT campus.

In April 2019, Leigh spent another week on the RIT campus and in addition to teaching classes he took part in a public discussion with RIT Senior Lecturer Mike Johansson on Curiosity & Creativity. The week was capped off by the unveiling of Leigh's BrickCityLand mural during the opening of RIT's Imagine RIT: Creativity and Innovation Festival, a campus-wide, open to the public event that showcases the creative and innovative spirit of RIT students, faculty and staff.

Rubin returned to the Rochester Institute of Technology in October 2019 for the Brick City Homecoming and Family Weekend, an annual tradition to celebrate alumni, students, parents and families, faculty, staff and friends of the university.

On August 25, 2020, Leigh Rubin and Phil Hands, editorial cartoonist for the Wisconsin State Journal performed a live stream event "When Cartoon Worlds Collide: A Twistedly Absurd Mashup of Politics and Comics" hosted by Deadline Club, the New York City chapter of Society of Professional Journalists.

== Publications ==
=== Books ===
- Notable Quotes. Rubes Publications, 1981. ISBN 978-0-941364-00-3
- Encore! Rubes Publications, 1983. ISBN 978-0-943384-03-0
- Amusing Arrangements. Rubes Publications, 1985. ISBN 978-0-943384-04-7
- The Penguin is Mightier than the Swordfish. Fragments West / Valentine Press, 1987. ISBN 978-0-916063-15-3
- Rubes. Penguin Group, 1988. ISBN 978-0-399-51488-3
- Sharks Are People Too! Rubes Publications, 1990. ISBN 978-0-943384-02-3
- Calves Can Be So Cruel: The Best of Rubes Cartoons. Penguin Group, 1990. ISBN 978-0-452-26509-7
- Rubes Calves Can Be So Cruel. Ravette Publishing, 1992. ISBN 978-1-85304-430-4
- Rubes Bible Cartoons. Hendrickson Publishers, 1999. ISBN 978-1-56563-423-7
- Rubes Then & Now: Cartoons for the Millennium and Beyond! Image Maker Publishing, 1999. ISBN 978-0-9644695-4-9
- The Wild Life of Dogs: A Rubes Cartoon Book. BowTie Press, 2003. ISBN 978-1-889540-98-6
- The Wild Life of Pets: A Rubes Cartoon Book. BowTie Press, 2003. ISBN 978-1-889540-99-3
- The Wild Life of Cows: A Rubes Cartoon Book. BowTie Press, 2003. ISBN 978-1-931993-36-4
- The Wild Life of Farm Animals: A Rubes Cartoon Book. BowTie Press, 2003. ISBN 978-1-931993-37-1
- The Wild Life of Cats: A Rubes Cartoon Book. Willow Creek Press, 2005. ISBN 978-1-59543-233-9
- The Wild Life of Love: A Rubes Cartoon Collection. Willow Creek Press, 2006. ISBN 978-1-59543-368-8
- The Wild and Twisted World of Rubes: A Rubes Cartoon Collection. Andrews McMeel Publishing, 2010. ISBN 978-0-7407-9156-7
- Rubes: Twisted Pop Culture. Pediment Group/Democrat and Chronicle, 2016.
- The Big Book of Moo. Pediment Group/NDHIA, 2016.
- Think Like a Cartoonist: A Celebration of Humor and Creativity. RIT Press, 2023. ISBN 978-1-956313-04-8

=== Calendars ===
- Rubes Farm Animal Funnies Family Organizer 2006 (Wall) Calendar. Willow Creek Press, 2005. ISBN 978-1-59543-230-8
- Rubes Zoo in a Box 2006 Daily Box Calendar. Willow Creek Press, 2005. ISBN 978-1-59543-182-0
- Rubes Animal Antics Family Organizer 2007 (Wall) Calendar. Willow Creek Press, 2006. ISBN 978-1-59543-323-7
- Rubes Zoo in a Box 2007 Daily Box Calendar. Willow Creek Press, 2006. ISBN 978-1-59543-416-6
- Rubes Animal Antics Family Organizer 2008 (Wall) Calendar. Willow Creek Press, 2007. ISBN 978-1-59543-499-9
- Rubes Zoo in a Box 2008 Daily Box Calendar. Willow Creek Press, 2007. ISBN 978-1-59543-624-5
- Rubes Zoo in a Box 2009 Daily Box Calendar. Willow Creek Press, 2008. ISBN 978-1-59543-831-7
- Rubes Zoo in a Box 2010 Daily Box Calendar. Willow Creek Press, 2009. ISBN 978-1-60755-046-4
- Rubes Zoo in a Box 2011 Daily Box Calendar. Willow Creek Press, 2010. ISBN 978-1-60755-246-8
- Rubes 2012 (Wall) Calendar. Day Dream Publishing, 2011. ISBN 978-1-4238-1135-0
- Rubes Zoo in a Box 2012 Daily Box Calendar. Mead, 2011. ISBN 978-1-4238-1240-1
- Rubes Zoo in a Box 2013 Daily Box Calendar. Mead, 2012. ISBN 978-1-4238-1612-6
- Rubes Zoo in a Box 2012 Daily Box Calendar. Willow Creek Press,
- Rubes Zoo in a Box 2014 Daily Box Calendar. Willow Creek Press.
- Rubes Zoo in a Box 2015 Daily Box Calendar. Willow Creek Press,
- Rubes Zoo in a Box 2016 Daily Box Calendar. Willow Creek Press, ISBN 978-1623435899
- Rubes Zoo in a Box 2017 Daily Box Calendar. Willow Creek Press, ISBN 978-1623435905
- Rubes Zoo in a Box 2018 Daily Box Calendar. Willow Creek Press, ISBN 978-1682346969
- Rubes Zoo in a Box 2019 Daily Box Calendar. Willow Creek Press, ISBN 978-1549203398
- Rubes Zoo in a Box 2020 Daily Box Calendar. Willow Creek Press, ISBN 978-1549209055

=== Mega Mini Kit ===
- Rubes Cow Tipping: You Can't Keep a Good Cow Down! Running Press, 2011. ISBN 978-0-7624-4008-5
