= Daddy's Home =

Daddy's Home may refer to:

- Daddy's Home (comic strip), an American daily comic strip by Tony Rubino and Gary Markstein
- Daddy's Home (film), a 2015 American comedy film
  - Daddy's Home 2, a 2017 sequel
- Daddy's Home (Big Daddy Kane album), 1994
- Daddy's Home (Sir Mix-a-Lot album), 2003
- Daddy's Home (St. Vincent album), 2021
- "Daddy's Home" (song), a 1961 song originally by Shep and the Limelites
- "Daddy's Home", a song by Sean Paul from his 2009 album Imperial Blaze
