= Stephen Bentley =

American cartoonist (born 1954)

Stephen Bentley (born 1954) is an American cartoonist with Creators Syndicate and the creator of Herb and Jamaal.

Originally from Los Angeles, Bentley moved to Pasadena as a teenager and attended John Muir High School, graduating in 1972. After high school he joined the United States Navy where he first began drawing newspaper cartoons. After the navy, Bentley attended Pasadena City College and Rio Hondo College majoring in art, English, and fire sciences, before beginning work in advertising.

Bentley is a deacon in the Episcopal Church.
