= Jerry Van Amerongen =

American cartoonist

Jerry Van Amerongen is a cartoonist based in the United States. His work includes the comic panel Ballard Street, which ran from 1991 till April 30, 2019. Before Ballard Street, he drew a comic panel entitled The Neighborhood for ten years. He has been recognized with the National Cartoonist Society Newspaper Panel Award for 2004 and 2006 for his work on Ballard Street. Van Amerongen's work is currently distributed by Creators Syndicate.

== Biography ==
Van Amerongen was born and raised in Grand Rapids, Michigan. After seventeen years in corporate sales, marketing and product management, Van Amerongen switched to cartooning at the age of 40. Jerry Van Amerongen's single panel cartoon The Neighborhood ran in newspapers throughout the United States from 1980 to 1990. The comic was similar in format and content to Gary Larson's The Far Side, employing a single panel gag cartoon infused with surreal humor. Van Amerongen discontinued The Neighborhood and began Ballard Street in 1991. Ballard Street ran as a multi-panel strip until 1993, when Van Amerongen reverted to the single panel format employed by The Neighborhood.

Van Amerongen's cartoon ideas come from scribbles and drawings as often as they do from preconceived ideas. The drawings themselves rely on facial expressions and body postures to give readers additional information beyond the caption, providing the motivation behind the action. Boyhood memories shaped by the ethnic influences of his Dutch and Polish heritage, images of roly-poly women in print dresses and rotund men in baggy trousers, shape the look of his characters. “Regardless of our physical appearance, we see ourselves as having wrinkles and rumples on the inside. We all perceive ourselves as having big bottoms”.

In April 2004, Van Amerongen's Giclee prints and some original pieces were presented during a one-man show at the Every Picture Tells A Story Gallery in Santa Monica, California. His Ballard Street was awarded the Best Newspaper Cartoon Panel Of The Year Award by the National Cartoonist Society in 2004 and 2006.
