= Ventresca =

Ventresca is a Southern Italian surname, originating from ventre, the Italian word for belly.

== Surname ==
Notable people with the surname include:

- Carla Ventresca, co-creator with her husband Henry Beckett of the comic strip On A Claire Day
- Vincent Ventresca (born 1966) American actor

== Food ==
- Ventresca tuna (from ventre, the Italian word for belly), is a luxury canned tuna, from the fatty bluefin tuna belly, also used in sushi as toro.
- Ventresca, from ventre, refers to the Italian word for belly, refers to bacon
- Ventresca, from ventre, refers to the Italian word for belly, refers to pancetta
