= Reply All =

Reply all may refer to:

- Reply all, an email responding to all parties on the original message
- Reply All (comic strip), a comic strip published by ArcaMax Publishing
- Reply All (podcast), a podcast about internet culture
