= Dave Coverly =

American cartoonist

Dave Coverly (born 1964) is the creator of the single-panel comic Speed Bump.

He grew up in Plainwell, Michigan, USA, and graduated from Eastern Michigan University (EMU) in Ypsilanti with a degree in philosophy. At EMU, he worked for the student newspaper, the Eastern Echo. He went on to get a master's degree in English from Indiana University.

Coverly took a year off from graduate school, and during that time he was an art director for a public relations firm and an editorial cartoonist for the Battle Creek Enquirer. He returned to Indiana in 1990 and became the editorial cartoonist for The Herald-Times in Bloomington, Indiana. His work appeared in Esquire, The Saturday Evening Post, The New York Times and USA Today. After Creators Syndicate picked up his untitled cartoon panel in 1994, it was given the title Speed Bump and, a year later, it was running in more than 90 papers. In 1995, Coverly left The Herald-Times to concentrate on Speed Bump.

== Personal life ==
Dave and his wife, Chris, live in Ann Arbor, Michigan, with their children, Alayna and Simone.

== Awards ==
He has been recognized for his work with the National Cartoonists Society Greeting Card Award for 1997 and another nomination for the same award for 1998, plus their Newspaper Panel Cartoon Award for 1994 and 2002, with additional nominations for 2000 and 2001. Coverly received their Reuben Award in 2008.

== Bibliography ==
=== Speed Bump Cartoon Collections ===
- Caution Speed Bump: Collection of Cartoon Skidmarks (June 2000)
- Speed Bump: Cartoons for Idea People (September 2004)
- Just One %$#@ Speed Bump After Another... More cartoons (December 2005)
- Dogs are People, Too: A Collection of Cartoons to Make Your Tail Wag (February 2014)
- Laughter is the Best Medicine (March 2014)
- Cats Are People, Too: A Collection of Cat Cartoons to Curl up With (April 2020)
- Speed Bump: A 25th Anniversary Collection (May 2020)

=== Speed Bump and Slingshot Misadventures (children's book series) ===
- Night of the Living Worms (June 2015)
- Night of the Living Shadows (October 2016)
- Night of the Living Zombie Bugs (October 2017)

=== Illustrator ===
- Sue MacDonald Had a Book by Jim Tobin (July 2009)
- The Very Inappropriate Word by Jim Tobin (August 2013)
- How to Care for Your T-Rex by Ken Baker (April 2019)
