= Girls & Sports =

American comic strip

Girls & Sports was an American comic strip written and illustrated by Justin Borus and Andrew Feinstein. It was created in 1997 and published in various college newspapers until 2004 when Borus and Feinstein began self-syndicating the strip. It was picked up for distributed by Creators Syndicate at the beginning of 2006, and was discontinued in 2011.

== History ==
Borus and Feinstein created Girls & Sports in 1997 while studying abroad in Denmark. The strips were based on their own dating experiences. When they returned to the United States, they began publishing their comic in their college newspapers. After college, Borus and Feinstein began marketing the comic to mainstream newspapers, which became the most widely syndicated independent comic strip in the country. From January 2010 to March 2011 the strip appeared on ESPN's Page 2. In May 2011, the strip was discontinued with brief mention by one of websites that featured the comic. The last daily strip appeared April 30, 2011 and the last Sunday strip appeared May 8.

In the summer of 2008, Girls & Sports appeared as a series of animated short cartoons on Fox Sports Net's late night talk show The Best Damn Sports Show Period.

== Characters ==
Girls & Sports deals with the dating lives of two men, Bradley and Marshall. Bradley is dating Joann but is not against going to the bar and hitting on other women, though he remains loyal to Joann (as far as she knows). Marshall is the perpetual single guy who listens to Bradley's advice even when it is against his better judgment. Joann thinks Marshall is a bad influence on Bradley.

== Book ==
Opening Lines, Pinky Probes and L-Bombs: The Girls & Sports Dating and Relationship Playbook, ISBN 1-59580-015-8, published October 28, 2006, is a comic anthology on the events and circumstances that confront singles in their everyday lives, including dating, the bar scene, sports, working out, parties, and vacations in the style of the Girls & Sports strips. It offers advice via charts, graphs, and text boxes.

== Reception ==
Comics historian R. C. Harvey described Girls & Sports as a "male chauvinist enterprise" with artwork that "hurts [his] eyes", but noted that Feinstein is "a dedicated cartoonist, whose vaulting ambition is matched by his tireless endeavor to do better (...) despite his awful artwork."
