= DailyINK =

- Company type: Subsidiary
- Industry: Email syndication
- Founded: 2006; 20 years ago
- Founder: Jay Kennedy
- Defunct: December 2013; 12 years ago
- Fate: Merged with Comics Kingdom
- Headquarters: New York City, New York, U.S.
- Products: Comic strips
- Services: Email comic strips directly to subscribers
- Owner: Hearst Communications
- Website: dailyink.com

DailyINK was an online service created by King Features Syndicate to email many classic and current comic strips directly to subscribers for an annual fee of $19.99. King Features described it as "the all-inclusive subscription service for the true comics fan." On a web site and via email, the DailyINK service made available more than 90 vintage and current comic strips, panels, games, puzzles and editorial cartoons.

Confronted by newspaper cutbacks, King Features began explore new venues, such as placing comic strips on mobile phones. In 2006, it launched DailyINK, an online service which initially billed subscribers $15 annually. A subscription showed up as a charge from Reed Brennan Media Associates, the online merchant for DailyINK. Each week, Reed Brennan Media Associates, a unit of the Hearst Corporation, edited and distributed more than 200 features for King Features.

Contemporary DailyINK strips ran the gamut from The Amazing Spider-Man to Zits. The vintage strips initially included Bringing Up Father, Buz Sawyer, Flash Gordon, Krazy Kat, The Little King, The Phantom and Rip Kirby. King Features editor Jay Kennedy introduced the service early in 2006, commenting:

Comics are consistently ranked among the most popular sections by newspaper readers. However, because of space, newspapers are not able to offer as vast a selection as many readers would like, and therefore millions of comic lovers are often not exposed to some of the most creative strips. In creating DailyINK, we wanted to ensure that fans had a destination where they could experience our complete line-up of award-winning comic artists and writers. DailyINK really sets the standard for comics online. By offering all of our current favorites updated daily, along with access to our archives of beloved characters as well as political humor and games, we have designed DailyINK.com as a destination fans will want to visit every day for something new.

In December 2013, Daily INK was relaunched as part of the new Comics Kingdom website.

== Vintage strips upgrade ==
With 11,000 subscribers by June 2010, more vintage strips were added to DailyINK, including Barney Google, Beetle Bailey, Big Ben Bolt, Brick Bradford, The Heart of Juliet Jones, Jackys Diary, The Katzenjammer Kids, Little Iodine, Mandrake the Magician, Office Hours, Quincy and Radio Patrol. On November 15, 2010, a subscription rate increase to $19.99 was announced, effective December 15, 2010, with applications available on iPhone, iPad and iPod Touch, plus a "new and improved" DailyINK in 2011. The redesign was by Blenderbox.

== Added features ==
Features added in 2011 included original publication dates, forum topics and a blog, mostly promotional but also with authoritative "Ask the Archivist" posts exploring comic strip history. The "Last 7" feature enables the reader to see a week's worth of comics on a single page. On the right side of the home page, collapsible activity boxes show what’s happening on the site: “Most Saved Today” lists the strips DailyINK users have added to their scrapbooks. “Most Active” indicates which strips are being shared on Facebook, Twitter and StumbleUpon. “Recent Comments” shows what users are saying about the strips. The "Scrapbook" feature allows one to save individual favorites to a personalized scrapbook for later viewing. A tiny calendar above each strip makes it possible to read or reread all strips of the previous year.

On the site, the strips appear larger than they do in emails, as noted in the site's FAQ: "The new DailyINK site displays comics much larger than before. In fact, they’re bigger now than when zoomed on the original site. Therefore a zoom function is no longer needed." Despite this claim, small details are sometimes lost because the strips cannot be enlarged. Traditionally, Sunday strips have always been published larger than daily strips, and that tradition continues here. However, Bill Griffith's Zippy, in an odd technological twist by DailyINK, is displayed small on Sunday and large in the dailies.

In 2012, Jackys Diary was dropped from DailyINK, and the Archivist explained, "Unfortunately, we no longer have the rights to publish the strip."

In April 2012, DailyINK began carrying the original Mort Walker and Dik Browne Hi and Lois in addition to the current Hi and Lois by Chance Browne, Brian Walker and Greg Walker.

== Awards ==
On January 13, 2012, the DailyINK app was voted as the People’s Champ in the Funny category in the 2011 Pixel Awards. Established in 2006, the Pixel Awards honor sites and apps displaying excellence in web design and development. Other nominees in the Funny category: JibJab Media Inc, Threaded, Snowball of Duty: White Opps and SoBe Staring Contest.

== See also ==
- ArcaMax Publishing
- GoComics
