= David Nyhan =

American journalist (1940–2005)

- Born: Charles David Nyhan Jr. December 23, 1940
- Died: January 23, 2005 (aged 64)
- Occupations: Journalist and biographer
- Known for: Columnist in The Boston Globe

David Nyhan (December 23, 1940 – January 23, 2005), born Charles David Nyhan Jr., was a journalist and biographer, whose op-ed column ran in The Boston Globe newspaper for many years. He graduated from Harvard College where he played varsity football.

His column was syndicated to more than 16 newspapers and magazines by Creators Syndicate, and after working for The Boston Globe for 32 years, he retired in 2001.

Boston-area professor and editor Bill Ketter remarked "For David Nyhan, giving voice to the voiceless was intuitive." He covered national politics and was a frequent source for commentary on presidential races and on the New Hampshire primary in particular.

Nyhan died aged 64 on January 23, 2005, at his home in Brookline, suffering a heart attack after shoveling snow.

== Legacy ==
The Shorenstein Center on Media, Politics and Public Policy at Harvard University established the David Nyhan Prize for Political Journalism in his honor. The first recipient of the prize was David Willman in 2005.
