= Doodles (comics) =

American comic strip by Christopher Foote

- Author(s): Christopher Foote
- Illustrator(s): Christopher Foote
- Website: http://www.christopherfoote.com
- Current status/schedule: Daily
- Launch date: 1985; 40 years ago
- End date: October 17, 2021
- Alternate name(s): Professor Doodles
- Syndicate(s): Creators Syndicate
- Genre(s): Activity Panel Strip

Doodles was an activity comic strip written and illustrated by Christopher Foote. Syndicated from 1985 until October 17, 2021, following Foote's death in July 2021, the comic was distributed by Creators Syndicate.

== Overview ==
The strip features four animal characters who entertain readers with a variety of activities, including: mazes, puzzles, jokes, puns, and riddles. Among the Doodles helpers are: Bosco, a lovable and inquisitive koala; Toby, a fun-loving hippo; Zak, a sarcastic but goofy giraffe, and Steve, a curious ape.

Readers are invited to send in their favorite jokes to the Doodles strip for inclusion in the weekly comic via mail or through the strip's web page: https://www.creators.com/read/doodles
