= Chuck Asay =

American cartoonist

- Born: Charles R. Asay; September 1, 1942 (age 84) Alamosa, Colorado, United States
- Area: Cartoonist
- Notable works: Editorial cartoons
- Awards: 1987 H. L. Mencken Award; 2000 R.C. Hollies Award

Charles R. Asay (pronounced AY-see; born September 1, 1942) is a conservative political cartoonist. He was an editorial cartoonist for the Colorado Springs Gazette until his retirement on March 28, 2007. Previously, he drew for the Taos News, Colorado Springs Sun, and briefly at the Denver Post. He continued to produce editorial cartoons through syndication by Creators Syndicate until June 29, 2013, when he announced his retirement through that day's cartoon.

== Career ==
Asay began drawing daily political cartoons for the Gazette Telegraph in 1986. He was known for having conservative opinions about controversial issues. Asay retired from The Gazette in 2007.
