= Chuckle Bros (comics) =

Comic by Brian and Ron Boychuk

- Author(s): Brian and Ron Boychuk
- Illustrator(s): Ronnie Martin (2006–2008); Ron Boychuk (2008–2017)
- Current status/schedule: concluded
- Launch date: 2006; 20 years ago
- End date: July 1, 2017; 8 years ago
- Syndicate(s): Creators Syndicate (2007–2017)
- Genre: Gag panel

Chuckle Bros was a single-panel comic created by Canadian brothers Brian and Ron Boychuk.

== Publication history ==
The comics were previously illustrated by Ronnie Martin, whose role was taken over by Ron Boychuk after he left to pursue other business ventures. The strip ended on July 1, 2017.

=== Beginnings ===
Brian Boychuk first began compiling ideas for comics while on vacation with family in 2003. After generating more than 20 solid concepts for comics, he approached his brother Ron, whose interest was also sparked, and the two came up with numerous ideas. As the brothers were not themselves artists, they began searching for an illustrator, putting advertisements on the internet as well as visiting art and animation classes with no success. Brian eventually met Ronnie Martin, a visual artist and sign painter, after he saw him sketching before a choir performance in which both of their daughters were involved. Brian asked Ronnie if he would be interested in drawing comics and he agreed. The comic made its debut in a self-published book entitled On the Road – First Edition Collection.

=== Syndication ===
In 2006, the trio pushed to have the comic syndicated and found success with Torstar Syndication Services. They signed with Creators Syndicate, a company based in Los Angeles, in 2007. Their work appeared in newspapers all across Canada, including the Ottawa Citizen, Victoria Times Colonist, the Regina Leader-Post, and Edmonton Journal.

=== Transition ===
Ronnie Martin left the strip in 2008 for another business opportunity, leaving Ron Boychuk, who had been honing his illustration skills since the project began, to take over.

== Characters and story ==
Chuckle Bros bears many similarities with Gary Larson's The Far Side. Brian Boychuk expresses how Larson's work was an important inspiration for him, so much so that he instructed Ronnie Martin when he was first brought on to draw people less elegantly to more closely match the style of Larson's, who are characteristically droopy and exaggerated. In an interview with the Ottawa Citizen, Martin said, "They were trying to make it more Larson-like, I was trying to make it less Larson-like -- I don't know a better way to term that," he says. "I feel that, today, it has evolved beyond those days a little bit."
