= Pros & Cons (comic strip) =

- Author: Kieran Meehan
- Current status/schedule: Running
- Launch date: September, 2005
- Syndicate(s): King Features Syndicate
- Genre(s): Humor, Professions, Family

Pros & Cons is a comic strip about a lawyer, a psychiatrist and a police officer created by Glasgow–based artist Kieran Meehan.It was known as A Lawyer, A Doctor & A Cop before July 7, 2008, when it was renamed in an effort to make the title easier to remember.

== Characters ==
Lyndon Peel is a sophisticated psychiatrist who is happily oblivious to his own issues.

Samuel Rhodes is a skeptical defense attorney. He is married to Michele. They have an opinionated seven-year-old named Jack, who is based on Meehan's younger brother, David, and nephew, Michael.

Stan Defoe, a tough-talking detective, is dedicated and street-wise.

Sophie Defoe, Stan's sister, is the sagacious proprietor of 'Defoe's Diner'

Gillian Jaggers, a brilliant District Attorney, is a ruthless opponent to Samuel in the courtroom. She and Stan dated for a while.

== Recurring themes ==
- Lyndon, Samuel and Stan, a trio of friends, are often seen eating at Defoe's Diner.
- The trio are also often seen trying to figure out a painting's meaning in an art gallery.
- Each of the characters are frequently shown solo, working in their respective professions.
