= The Barn (comic strip) =

American comic strip by Ralph Hagen

- Author: Ralph Hagen
- Illustrator: Ralph Hagen
- Website: http://www.gocomics.com/thebarn
- Current status/schedule: Syndicated
- Launch date: October 2008; 17 years ago
- Syndicate(s): Creators Syndicate
- Publisher(s): Bailey & Bauer
- Genre(s): Satire, Humor, Everyday life

The Barn is a comic created by Canadian cartoonist Ralph Hagen and syndicated by Creators Syndicate starting in October, 2008. While the strip has a number of characters, the humor of the strip is based on the daily adventures, mishaps, and/or dialogue between a curious sheep named Rory and a sarcastic bull named Stan. Storylines mimic the everyday experiences of their human captors. The setting is a farm yard next door to a veterinary clinic, where Stan and Rory usually spend time with the owner and vet, Brenda.

After 25 years working in the Chevron oilfields of Alberta, Hagen took an early retirement in 2004 and decided to work as a cartoonist full-time. While developing potential strips for syndication he worked as a freelance artist selling to clients, newspapers, and magazines such as Reader's Digest, Saturday Evening Post and Woman's World. Hagen turned in multiple strips to syndicates hoping for a contract with no success. Hagen then came up with two concepts: one was rough drafts of a strip that involved farm animals, with a bull and sheep as the main characters; the other was about animals in a vet clinic. The creators then suggested to combine the two ideas. Hagen turned in 20 rough drafts to Creators Syndicate and within weeks got a contract. After 6 months of preparation and revision, the strip was released in October, 2008.

Hagen first brainstorms ideas on a scratch piece of paper then transfers the ideas to a finished copy on white copy paper; inking with a Sakura 08 micron pen. Next the drawing is scanned in Adobe Photoshop, the frames and lettering are added as well. The artwork is then sent to Vertis Communication in Buffalo, New York for coloring (Hagen colors the Sunday weekly himself). Vertis then sends the artwork to Creators Syndicate in Los Angeles where it is checked for spelling and punctuation errors before sending the final product to subscribed papers.
