= Adrian Raeside =

New Zealand cartoonist (born 1957)

- Born: 1957 (age 68–69) Dunedin, New Zealand
- Areas: Editorial cartoonist, comic strip artist, author

Adrian Raeside (born 1957 in Dunedin, New Zealand) is a New Zealand-born Canadian author, comic strip creator and founder of an animation company.

== Early years ==
He began drawing cartoons on washroom walls as a kid. After being expelled from his first (and last) art class at the age of 15, he moved with his parents to England, then to Canada. While there, he worked at various jobs, from loading grain ships in Thunder Bay, Ontario, to surveying on the West Coast. Illustrating his mother Joan Raeside's children's books got him his start in the art business. Raeside began drawing editorial cartoons for the Times Colonist in Victoria, British Columbia in 1979. He occupied the editorial cartoonist position until 2015, and after a break he returned to the newspaper in 2019. Raeside's editorial cartoons have been reprinted in hundreds of publications worldwide.

== Career ==
Raeside founded and operated an animation company called Heckle Films in 1988 to animate editorial cartoons for CBC Television. Over the next four years, he created, directed and produced dozens of animated shows for Turner Broadcasting and Children's Television Workshop, adapting two Jim Henson Muppet characters for animation. Raeside adapted the book The Way Things Work as an animated series being broadcast on BBC. Raeside left animation production in 1992 but has since written dozens of scripts for animation, series that includes Atomic Betty, The Amazing Adrenalinis and Pirate Express.

Raeside created The Other Coast in 1990, a satirical comic strip which features two dogs and looks at life from a dog's perspective. The Other Coast appears in hundreds of publications, worldwide.

Raeside is the author of over twenty books, including There Goes the Neighbourhood: An Irreverent History of Canada; The Demented Decade; and 5 Twisted Years. Raeside also wrote and illustrated the popular Dennis the Dragon series of children's books with his mother, Joan Raeside. In 2009 he published Return to Antarctica, an account of his grandfather Sir Charles (Silas) Wrights' experience on Captain Robert Scott's 1910 British Antarctic Expedition to be first to reach the South Pole, which resulted in the death of Scott and four companions. Raeside researched the book by travelling to Cape Evans, in the Ross Sea, following in his grandfather's footsteps. Raeside is also related to two other members of the Scott Expedition: Sir Raymond Priestley and Griffith Taylor. Beside the book Return to Antarctica, Raeside produced a 1-hour documentary of the same name.

Raeside published No Sailing Waits and Other Ferry Tales, a collection of BC ferry-related editorial cartoons in 2012 by Harbour Publishing, followed by a collection of dog-related strips from The Other Coast strip called Tails Don't Lie - A Decade of Dog Cartoons (70 in Dog Years) also published by Harbour Publishing in 2013, remained on the bestseller list for over 6 months. Raeside wrote and illustrated The Rainbow Bridge - A Visit to Pet Paradise (Harbour 2012) as a way to comfort those who have lost a pet.

Adrian Raeside lives in Whistler, British Columbia.

== Published works ==
- There Goes the Neighbourhood: An Irreverent History of Canada (1992)
- The Demented Decade (1993)
- The Other Coast: Road Rage In Beverly Hills (2004)
- Return to Antarctica: The Amazing Adventure of Sir Charles Wright on Robert Scott's Journey to the South Pole (2009)
- No Sailing Waits And Other Ferry Tales: 30 Years of BC Ferries Cartoons (2012)
- Tails Don't Lie: A Decade of Dog Cartoons (70 In Dog Years) (2013)
- The Best of Adrian Raeside: A Treasury of BC Cartoons (2014)
- Tails Don't Lie 2: A Pack Of Dog Cartoons (2017)
- The Rainbow Bridge: A Visit to Pet Paradise (2020)
- The World According to Dogs: An Owner's Manual (2021)
- Wildlife for Idiots: And Other Animal Cartoons (2022)
- Paradise for Cats: A Return to the Rainbow Bridge (2023)
- The Canada Handbook (2025)
