= Carpe Diem (comic strip) =

- Author(s): Niklas Eriksson
- Current status/schedule: ongoing, daily
- Launch date: (with King Features) May 4, 2015
- Syndicate(s): King Features Syndicate
- Genre(s): Gag, humor

Carpe Diem is a gag panel comic strip by Swedish cartoonist Niklas Eriksson, syndicated by King Features. "Inspired by Gary Larson's The Far Side and Dan Piraro's Bizarro, Carpe Diem takes timeless situations that happen in daily life and spin them on their head, casting them anywhere from the dawn of the universe to modern-day couch potatoes, and every day in-between."

== Publication history ==
Carpe Diem was launched in c. 2007, winning "the Pondus Award, Sweden’s biggest comic prize, in 2008. Since that time the strip has been distributed throughout Scandinavia."

Carpe Diem began being syndicated by King Features in May 2015, with it landing in 80 newspapers, an impressive debut figure given the shrinkage in the newspaper industry.
