= Flo & Friends =

American syndicated daily comic strip

- Author(s): John Gibel (creator), Rose Ellison King (writer); Jenny Campbell
- Current status/schedule: Active daily
- Launch date: 2002
- Syndicate(s): Creators Syndicate
- Genre(s): Humor, aging

Flo & Friends is an American syndicated daily comic strip drawn by Jenny Campbell and distributed by Creators Syndicate. The comic was originally created by John Gibel in 2002.

== Concept ==
The motto of Flo & Friends is "Aging with an Attitude." The strip centers on Flo, a senior citizen whose life does not conform to stereotypes about the elderly, along with her family and friends. The main characters do not age, but the strip follows the cycle of the year and may mention current events, such as the pandemic and elections. The strip is realistic but lighthearted about the challenges of aging. A common refrain is "old age is not for sissies." There is a large cast of occasional characters who represent different aspects of and attitudes to aging.

== Main characters ==
- Flo, 65: A retired widow. She used to host a radio show giving inspiring advice to callers. She is optimistic and works hard to stay mentally youthful and active.
- Jack, not yet 50: Flo's son, who lives with her. He is despondent about being single and unemployed, but inactive in looking for work. He does not receive much respect from the other characters.
- Treggie, sometimes Tregg, 15: Flo's granddaughter, who lives with Flo and her uncle Jack. Her parents are never mentioned. She attends high school and is smart, inquisitive, and caring, though occasionally angsty and rebellious. She has a good relationship with Flo and her older friends. She does a lot to keep Flo young, and also frequently highlights the vast differences between her own generation and her grandmother's.
- Tina, 15: Treggie's best friend. She is more interested in boys than school-work and often shows a lack of common sense. She lives with her mother, a psychiatrist.
- Ruthie, 85: A widow with several great-grandchildren, who has lived with Flo and her family since the pandemic lockdown, having previously lived alone with her cat Cleo (despite the name, a male cat). She is sweet and quirky, with some odd ideas about the modern world. She has known Flo since they were both young. The younger characters call her "Aunt Ruthie."
- Winnie, 85: A close friend of Flo's. She has endured several marriages and is cynical about love and life. She is a hairdresser and a keen gardener. She has her own house near Flo's.
- Francesca, preteen: Winnie's granddaughter. She spends a lot of time at Winnie's, despite her mother regarding Winnie as a bad influence.
- Larry, 85: A widower friend of Flo's who lives in the nearby senior living facility. He is often in demand as a handyman. He is called "Uncle Larry" by Treggie.
- Mr. and Mrs. O: George Ortiz, 100, is a wheelchair-using resident of the senior living facility, who is proud of his age but acts like a youngster. His wife, Lupe Ortiz, struggles to keep him in line. They quarrel frequently but not seriously. They have a large family.
- Lulu: a sharp-tongued drinking companion of Jack's.

== Creators ==
The strip's creator John Gibel, had the idea to create a strip about seniors while volunteering at non-profit organizations in Cleveland, Ohio. However, he felt he needed help since "he knew he wasn't funny or artistic," so he enlisted Jenny Campbell, a freelance illustrator, and John Murtha to assist. Campbell assumed responsibility for the strip after the sudden death of John Gibel in early 2005.

Jenny Campbell grew up in the Phoenix–Scottsdale area, and graduated from Arizona State University in 1979, beginning as a fine arts major, but finishing with a BA in journalism. While still in college, she started at The Arizona Republic as the paper's first female copyboy and went on to become a picture editor, occasional feature writer and sometime cartoonist. She then worked for the Pasadena Star-News and the Orange County Register. She eventually ended up in Chagrin Falls, Ohio in 1996, enabling her to connect with John Gibel through a mutual friend.
