= Gary Varvel =

American cartoonist (born 1957)

- Born: 1957 (age 68–69); Indianapolis, Indiana, U.S.
- Education: Indiana University–Purdue University Indianapolis
- Known for: Editorial cartoons
- Awards: Aronson Award for Cartooning with a Conscience (2010); Reuben Award (2010); Robert F. Kennedy Journalism Award (2011); National Headliners Award (2012)
- Website: garyvarvel.com

Gary Varvel (born 1957) is an American editorial cartoonist. Varvel was the editorial cartoonist for Indianapolis Star from 1994 to 2019. He was the chief artist for The Indianapolis News for 16 years. His works are syndicated with Creators Syndicate.

== Career ==
=== Cartooning ===
Varvel was inspired by Mad when he was younger, as well as by artist Pat Oliphant, cartoonist Mike Peters, and editorial cartoonist Jeff MacNelly. He worked as a sports editor and cartoonist at the Danville High School newspaper, where he won first place in a cartoon contest held by the paper. After graduating in 1975, he studied art at Indiana University–Purdue University Indianapolis. He worked for about a year at a weekly newspaper before he was hired in 1978 as the newsroom artist at The Indianapolis News, where he worked until 1994.

He began work as the editorial cartoonist for Indianapolis Star in 1994 following the retirement of Pulitzer Prize-winning Charles Werner. He was awarded the H. Dean Evans Legacy Award for community service in 2006. In 2010, he received the Grambs Aronson Award for Cartooning with a Conscience for a series of cartoons about child poverty. That same year, the National Cartoonists Society awarded him the Reuben Award in the Best Editorial Cartoonist division.

In the week before Thanksgiving in 2014, the Indianapolis Star published a cartoon by Varvel that was widely criticized as being racist. In the cartoon, a white family is seen inside their dining room at a dinner table with an unhappy father holding a baked turkey saying "Thanks to the President's immigration order, we'll be having extra guests this Thanksgiving," while darker-skinned people can be seen climbing through their window. The Star later removed the mustache of one of the intruders, and executive editor Jeff Taylor deleted the cartoon entirely and issued an apology one day later. In the apology, Taylor wrote, "Gary did not intend to be racially insensitive in his attempt to express his strong views about President Barack Obama's decision to temporarily prevent the deportation of millions of immigrants living and working illegally in the United States."

Varvel was inducted into the Indiana Journalism Hall of Fame in October 2015. In 2018, another cartoon spurred an apology by the Indianapolis Star after some readers viewed Varvel's message as demeaning to women and sexual assault victims.

In 2019, he retired from the Indianapolis Star.

On January 9, 2021, in response to the permanent suspension of Donald Trump's Twitter account and the removal of the social media app Parler from the Google Play Store, Varvel published an editorial cartoon of a man with a worried expression removing the "December 2020" page from a calendar on the wall and noticing the next page reading "January 1984" (a reference to the George Orwell book Nineteen Eighty-Four). The cartoon received widespread criticism for its depiction of the actions of non-government entities being likened to state-mandated censorship, and gained internet meme status through various edits starting as early as January 19.

In 2023, the Toronto Sun published a cartoon by Varvel that was criticized for being antisemitic and Ukrainophobic by Canadian Ukrainian and Jewish groups. In the cartoon, Ukraine's president Volodymyr Zelenskyy, who is Jewish, is depicted with a Jewish nose, stealing a wallet out of U.S. President Joe Biden's pocket. Canadian Prime Minister Justin Trudeau called the illustration "the worst kind of antisemitic content." The Sun later apologized for publishing Varvel's comic, saying it did not meet their editorial standards and that Varvel's work would no longer be used.

=== Writing ===
Varvel co-wrote The Board (a 2008 short film) and The War Within (a 2014 film) with his son, Brett. Both films were produced by House of Grace Films, Brett's Christian film production company. He also wrote a children's book titled The Good Shepherd (2014, ISBN 9780692314838), released through the film production company.

He also writes the syndicated comic Off Center.

== Selected awards and honors ==
In addition to the following selected awards and honors, Varvel is a fifteen-time winner of the Indiana Society of Professional Journalists' Award for Best Editorial Cartoon and a thirteen-time winner of the Best Editorial Cartoonist Award in the Hoosier State Press Association.

Year	Organization	Award title, Category	Work	Result	Refs
2006		H. Dean Evans Legacy Award, Community service	n/a	Won	
2010	National Cartoonists Society	Reuben Award, Best Editorial Cartoonist	n/a	Won	
2010		Grambs Aronson Award, Cartooning with a Conscience	Path to Hope series	Won	
2011	Robert F. Kennedy Center for Justice and Human Rights	Robert F. Kennedy Journalism Award	n/a	Won	
2012		National Headliners Award, Editorial cartooning	n/a	Won	
2015	Hoosier State Press Association	Indiana Journalism Hall of Fame	n/a	Inducted	
2018	Benjamin Harrison Presidential Site	Advancing American Democracy Award	n/a	Won	

== Personal life ==
Varvel was born in 1957 in Indianapolis, Indiana to Forest and Priscilla Varvel, and grew up in Danville, Indiana. He has three children with his wife, Carol.
