= Diamond Lil (GoComics) =

American comic strip by Brett Koth

- Author: Brett Koth
- Website: http://lilcomics.blogspot.com/
- Current status/schedule: Daily reprints
- Launch date: March 1, 2010
- End date: September 27, 2025 (daily), October 5, 2025 (Sunday)
- Syndicate(s): Creators Syndicate
- Publisher: GoComics

Diamond Lil is a daily comic strip published by Creators syndicate and created by Paws, Inc. writer and artist Brett Koth about the life of Lillian Bilious, "a feisty 75-year-old widow" in the fictional town of Turkey Knuckle, Indiana. It ran new comics from March 1, 2010 – September 27, 2025 (daily), October 5, 2025 (Sunday).

The character is named after a diamond anniversary (75 years), and because she is "one of the hardest substances known to man". Strips regularly feature her blunt and forthright opinions.
