= For Heaven's Sake (comic strip) =

American comic strip by Mike Morgan

For Heaven's Sake is an American comic strip by Mike Morgan with a religious humor theme. It is syndicated by Creators Syndicate and debuted in September 1991.
