= Michael Ramirez =

American cartoonist

- Born: Michael Patrick Ramirez; May 11, 1961 (age 65) Tokyo, Japan
- Area: cartoonist
- Notable works: Editorial cartoons
- Awards: full list

Michael Patrick Ramirez (born May 11, 1961) is an American cartoonist for the Las Vegas Review-Journal. His cartoons present mostly conservative viewpoints. He is a two-time Pulitzer Prize winner and is internationally syndicated by Creators Syndicate. In an extraordinary arrangement, his work appears simultaneously on Tuesdays and Fridays in the Washington Post and the Las Vegas Review-Journal.

== Early life and education ==
Ramirez was born in Tokyo, Japan, to a Mexican-American father and Japanese-American mother. He graduated from the University of California, Irvine in 1984 with a bachelor's degree. He worked for The Commercial Appeal of Memphis for seven years and then for the Los Angeles Times. In 1994, he was awarded the Pulitzer Prize for Editorial Cartooning. He again won the Pulitzer for editorial cartooning in 2008. He is a three-time winner of the Society of Professional Journalists' Sigma Delta Chi Award for excellence in journalism in 1995, 1997 and 2007. In 1996, he was given the Mencken Award for Best Editorial Cartoon. He is a regular contributor to USA Today and The Weekly Standard, and his work has a subscription/distribution of over five hundred and fifty newspapers and magazines through Creators Syndicate. He was also the co-editor of the Investor's Business Daily editorial page. In 2018, he joined the Las Vegas Review-Journal.

== Career ==
Ramirez initially planned to study medicine in college and considered journalism a hobby. He became seriously interested in that field when his first cartoon for the college newspaper, lampooning candidates for student office, had the student assembly demanding an apology.

Ramirez was a regular guest on The NewsHour with Jim Lehrer. He has been on CNN, CNN International, Fox News Sunday, BBC Television, BBC Radio, NPR, and The Michael Reagan Show. His cartoons have been featured on CNN, Fox News, The O'Reilly Factor, and The Rush Limbaugh Show. His work has been published in such publications as The New York Times, The Washington Post, The New York Post, Time Magazine, Politico, National Review and U.S. News & World Report.

He is the author of two books, Everyone Has the Right to My Opinion and Give Me Liberty or Give Me Obamacare.

=== Cartoon controversies ===
In October 2000, the Los Angeles Times published a Ramirez cartoon that appeared to depict a Jewish man worshiping the word "Hate" embedded into the Western Wall. According to the Times Associate Editor Narda Zacchino ombudsman, this provoked an "unprecedented" negative reaction. Ramirez denied singling out Jews, claiming that the wall in the cartoon was not meant to suggest the Western Wall, and that while there was a Jew worshiping at the hate wall, there was also a figure bowing before it wearing a kaffiyeh (though it is difficult to see).

In July 2003, the Los Angeles Times published a Sunday editorial cartoon by Ramirez that depicted a man pointing a gun at President Bush's head; it was a takeoff on the 1969 Pulitzer Prize-winning photo by Eddie Adams that showed Vietnamese general Nguyễn Ngọc Loan executing a Viet Cong prisoner at point-blank range. The cartoon prompted a visit from the Secret Service, but no charges were filed.

In September 2007, the Columbus Dispatch published a Ramirez cartoon depicting Iran as a sewer (labeled with the word "extremism"), with cockroaches spreading from it over Iraq, Afghanistan, and other countries of the Middle East. Some commentators compared this with characterizations both of Jews in pre-Holocaust Germany and Rwandan Tutsis before the 1994 genocide.

In July 2013, Investor's Business Daily published a Ramirez cartoon that depicted lynching in its criticism of Al Sharpton.

In October 2013, Investor's Business Daily published a Ramirez cartoon that drew a parallel between the problems of the Affordable Care Act web site debut and the Space Shuttle Challenger disaster, to which many critics objected.

The Washington Post retracted a cartoon by Ramirez in November 2023, published as a satirical a comment on the Gaza war. Titled "Human Shields", it depicted a large-nosed snarling Palestinian man labelled "Hamas" stating "How dare Israel attack civilians..." while strapped with four children and a cowering woman wearing a hijab. The cartoon's publication sparked a backlash, with critics decrying the cartoon as "racist," leading to its withdrawal from the Post, but the cartoon remains published at Ramirez's home newspaper, The Las Vegas Review-Journal. Ramirez defended his cartoon, stating that "[i]ts focus is on a specific individual [senior Hamas official Ghazi Hamad] and the statements he made on behalf of a specific organization he represents".

=== Syndication ===
Ramirez is syndicated internationally by Creators Syndicate. Ramirez's cartoons were carried in the Los Angeles Times until the end of 2005. Investor's Business Daily carried his cartoons from 2006 until the end of its run as a daily newspaper in 2016.

== Awards ==
- 1994: Pulitzer Prize for Editorial Cartooning
- 1995: Sigma Delta Chi Award for Editorial Cartooning
- 1996: Mencken Award for Editorial Cartooning, presented by Free Press Association
- 1997: UCI Medal, University of California, Irvine
- 1997: Sigma Delta Chi Award for Editorial Cartooning
- 2004: Lincoln Fellow, Claremont Institute
- 2005: Scripps Howard Foundation, National Journalism Award for Editorial Cartooning
- 2006: National Cartoonist Society Division Award for Editorial Cartooning
- 2007: Sigma Delta Chi Award for Editorial Cartooning
- 2008: National Cartoonist Society Division Award for Editorial Cartooning
- 2008: Pulitzer Prize for Editorial Cartooning
- 2008: Fischetti Award for Editorial Cartooning
- 2011: National Cartoonist Society Division Award for Editorial Cartooning
- 2013: National Cartoonist Society Division Award for Editorial Cartooning
- 2014: National Cartoonist Society Division Award for Editorial Cartooning
- 2015: National Cartoonist Society The Reuben Award
- 2018: Benjamin Harrison Presidential Site Advancing American Democracy Award
- Honorary Member of Pi Sigma Alpha, National Political Honor Society
