= Archie (comic strip) =

American comic strip

- March 3, 1957 original Bob Montana artwork.
- Author: Bob Montana (1946–1975); Craig Boldman (?–2011)
- Illustrator(s): Dan DeCarlo (1975–c. 2001), Fernando Ruiz (?-2011) & Bob Smith (1998–2011)
- Current status/schedule: Daily & Sunday; reruns
- Launch date: February 4, 1946
- End date: June 2011; reruns
- Syndicate(s): McClure Newspaper Syndicate (1947 – c. 1952); King Features Syndicate (c. 1952 – c. 1987); Creators Syndicate (c. 1987 – present)
- Publisher: Archie Comics
- Genre(s): Humor, teens

Archie is a long-running American comic strip based on the line of the popular Archie Comics featuring the character Archie Andrews. Launched by McClure Newspaper Syndicate on February 4, 1946, it features the misadventures of Archie Andrews and his pals. Archie is currently distributed by the Creators Syndicate.

== Publication history ==
Bob Montana drew the first issue of the Archie comic book (November 1942). In 1946, he began drawing Archie daily and Sunday strips for 700 newspapers. He died of a heart attack on January 4, 1975, while cross-country skiing in Meredith, New Hampshire. Dan DeCarlo then took over the strip.

The Archie comic strip was written by Craig Boldman, pencilled by Fernando Ruiz, lettered by Jon D'Agostino, and inked by Bob Smith until June 2011. After that, Archie's publisher ceased creating new strips and began reprinting older strips by Dan DeCarlo.

== See also ==
- Cartoonists Remember 9/11
