= The Meaning of Lila =

American comic strip (2003–2012)

- Author(s): "L.A. Rose" (John Forgetta, Kathy Dow)
- Illustrator(s): "L.A. Rose" (Justin Raines, Jackie Gentile, and Tony Calabro)
- Current status/schedule: Concluded daily & Sunday strip
- Launch date: 2003
- End date: 2012
- Syndicate(s): Creators Syndicate
- Genre: Humor

The Meaning of Lila is a comic strip written by John Forgetta, and three co-workers (writer Kathy Dow and illustrators Justin Raines, Jackie Gentile, and Tony Calabro) who are identified as "L. A. Rose." It is syndicated by Creators Syndicate. The strip centers on Lila, her cubicle partner and close friend Boyd, and their friend and co-worker Drew. The central theme of the comic is about Lila trying to find the right man (or any man for that matter) but always failing due to her pickiness and bad luck. Other themes include her dislike of her job, popular culture, and her obsession with shopping (especially shoes). The trio of friends are most often shown either at work, having drinks at the bar, shopping, or watching TV at home.

== Publication history ==
On September 29, 2012, John Forgetta announced that he could no longer afford to continue with the comic and would no longer produce new ones. He left the final story arc as a cliff-hanger and stated, on his blog, that he hopes to reactivate the strip in the future. The strip continues to appear as re-runs. The strip ran for 9 years (2003-2012).

== Characters ==
=== Lila Mayfield ===
Lila, Boyd and Drew with Lila's cat, Frankie

Lila, fired for multiple infractions including chronic lateness but then rehired, works as a customer service representative, answering telephones for MetroMart, a fictional large retail store in Cleveland, Ohio. She dislikes her job, but seems too afraid or unmotivated to change the status quo. She is in her mid to late 20s and her main objectives in life are finding the right man and the right pair of shoes. Lila is very attractive, but seems to lack confidence in herself. Lila is also shallow, materialistic, and self-centered. She doesn't read books or newspapers, but loves to read celebrity gossip and fashion magazines. Lila runs her own shoe blog on the Internet, where she writes about and gives advice about women's shoes. Lila is too lazy to exercise or join a gym and prefers fatty foods, but is nevertheless slim. She has a cat named Frankie.

Lila seems to have encountered a larger purpose to her life, though, after volunteering at the Cleveland Clinic, albeit at first to meet an attractive pediatrician, Dr. Fine. She took a shine to an orphaned, leukemia-stricken girl named Annie, whose cynical yet upbeat outlook struck a chord with her, and they became friends. She applied to adopt her, despite being unemployed, but was rejected in favor of Dr. Fine and his gay partner Alan, which deeply disappointed both Lila and Annie.

=== Annie ===
Eventually, Lila did manage to adopt Annie, who has proven to be a child prodigy, a gambler, and an expert computer hacker. Dr. Fine, Alan and Boyd are always there to help Lila with Annie, who now has four parents for all practical purposes.

=== Boyd Thompson ===
Boyd "is Lila's GBFF (gay best friend forever) from childhood", and former coworker in the MetroMart call center. The two seem to be inseparable despite the fact that they have no romantic feelings for each other. Boyd and Lila have the same personality and view on life. Boyd's homosexuality was hinted at in earlier strips (e.g. his interest in shirtless photos of Matthew McConaughey), but became overt when, on the May 15, 2008, strip, Boyd was outed through conversation about another male.

=== Drew Worthington ===
Drew is almost a complete opposite of Lila. She is hardworking, confident, smart, reads books and newspapers, and doesn't put as much importance on material possessions or celebrity gossip. An attractive blonde, Drew works out at the gym and is conscientious about what she eats. She is more successful than Lila, having a higher position at MetroMart. Drew was also more successful in love (at least for a while), as she had a fiancé (then husband, a doctor named Tad). Still, despite their differences, they are still good friends and she enjoys spending time with Lila while shopping or having drinks. However, Drew is often shown lecturing Lila and Boyd on how to be better people, and is often disappointed in them.

Drew's fiancé was caught cheating on her, causing them to break up and call off the wedding. Lila is able to show compassion for her friend in her time of need. Drew and Tad later reconciled, then married after she became pregnant with their son. Sadly, she lost her baby and was seriously injured herself in an auto accident caused by her texting while driving; making things worse, Lila and Boyd discovered that Tad was continuing to cheat on her with multiple women, but Lila was not able to break this to her in her fragile state.

=== Lila's mom ===
Although never drawn in panels, Lila's mom is often depicted talking to Lila on the phone. Lila's mom is very disappointed in her daughter still being single, adding even more pressure for Lila to find a man. She also acts as an intermediary between Lila and her father, as he is too lazy to talk to anyone.

=== Mr. Payne ===
He is Lila's boss at MetroMart. Drew and Alexandra dislike him because of his sexist behavior, while Lila is pleased as he seems to have taken a liking to her.

=== Alexandra Ferrington ===
She is Lila's department supervisor. She is younger than the trio of friends and takes her job very seriously. Lila and Boyd hate her as she is unpleasant and tries to have them meet her high standards. She has been shown being mean to Lila while drunk at a party.
