= Deflocked =

Comic strip by Jeff Corriveau

- Deflocked comic showing (l to r) Cobb, Mamet, Tucker and Rupert
- Author: Jeff Corriveau
- Website: Deflocked
- Current status/schedule: In syndication
- Launch date: 2006
- Syndicate(s): King Features Syndicate

Deflocked is a comic strip written and illustrated by Jeff Corriveau, which follows the adventures of four major characters, described as "deliriously funny yet seriously dysfunctional." The strip, which Corriveau originally based loosely on Hippocrates' Four Humours attempts to detail relationships similar to Norman Lear’s All in the Family through the exploits of Mamet, a wayward sheep, the dog siblings Cobb and Rupert, and Tucker, an 8-year-old boy raised by the dogs. The strip was syndicated in May 2008.

The strip is set in the American suburbs on an old farmstead called Lubberland Farms which has a secret home for displaced, disenchanted, and disoriented outcasts. Mamet, a self-absorbed sheep, is the main character who acts recklessly and at times insults the other characters. He interacts with the mature, morally centered dog Cobb and Cobb’s immature but devoted younger sibling Rupert. The two dogs raise Tucker, a human boy with a dark and twisted disposition.

== History ==
Deflocked made its debut in the La Canada Valley Sun newspaper in California in 2006. Corriveau had been writing comedy for Saturday Night Live, The Tonight Show with Jay Leno and as head writer for Talk Soup. Since the paper was unable to pay for the strip, Corriveau provided it to them without charge. In May 2008, Deflocked was picked up by King Features and is now available in many newspapers.

Corriveau’s Deflocked has also appeared since June 16, 2007 in the PETA blog, written by Jack Shepherd. Once the comic strip was available through King Features syndication, PETA stopped featuring the strip, although Corriveau has continued to supply the organization with cartoons and artwork on other issues such as horse racing.

== Main characters ==
=== Mamet ===
Mamet is an opinionated sheep with a biting comment and point of view about everyone and everything. He is out for himself, cynical, and arrogant, and willing to share his ignorance with all.

=== Cobb ===
Cobb is a mature dog, older sibling and father surrogate to Rupert, and the voice of morality and reason in the group. Cobb seeks peace and balance in the world but is constantly distracted from his goal by a crazy world and obnoxious sheep.

=== Rupert ===
Rupert is the younger sibling of Cobb. He wanders innocently and naïvely around while upsetting Mamet’s theories and being led into schemes and activities by Tucker.

=== Tucker ===
Tucker is the only human in the group and only eight years old. He was mysteriously dropped on the doorstep of Cobb and Rupert who have raised him as their own. Tucker is young and willing to go along with anything especially his "Uncle" Mamet’s questionable adventures from which Cobb and Rupert try to protect him.

== Subject matter ==
Deflocked follows the often odd and bizarre adventures of the four main characters. Corriveau frequently has his characters supporting the animals’ view of issues rather than the human view. While penning the strip for PETA, Corriveau often focused on mulesing, the practice of removing flesh from the buttocks of merino sheep to avoid flystrike, a practice used almost exclusively in Australia.

== Family life ==
Corriveau lives in Montrose, California with his wife Karen, their daughter Amelie, and Beemer, a cat.
