= Dog eat Doug =

American comic strip by Brian Anderson

- Default title panel for Dog eat Doug Sunday strips from 2005 to 2007.
- Author: Brian Anderson
- Current status/schedule: Running
- Launch date: November 14, 2005
- Syndicate(s): Creators Syndicate
- Genre: Humor / Politics / Social satire

Dog eat Doug (often abbreviated DeD) is a comic strip written and illustrated by Brian Anderson. It began in 2004 as a webcomic that ran on the cartoonist's homepage and Comics Sherpa, and was later picked up for newspaper syndication through Creators Syndicate. The newspaper run began on November 14, 2005.

The "Dog" in the title refers to Sophie, a Chocolate lab; while Doug, the infant son of her owner, serves as the other half. The two share a love-hate relationship in their everyday lives and imaginations, with Doug often responding to Sophie's actions by saying "Bak!" Doug's parents also make appearances in the strip as minor characters, though they are only seen from the neck down, similarly to animated shows such as Cow and Chicken.

In the January 7, 2017 strip, Anderson announced the death of his real dog Sophie. On March 22, 2021, Dog Eat Doug went into reruns while Anderson needed some extra time to finish prep for a few other projects, including compiling a new Dog Eat Doug collection.
