= On a Claire Day =

American comic strip (2006–2014)

- Author(s): Henry Beckett and Carla Ventresca
- Website: On a Claire Day website
- Current status/schedule: Concluded daily gag-a-day strip
- Launch date: June 18, 2006
- End date: June 14, 2014
- Syndicate(s): Creators Syndicate
- Genre(s): Humor

On a Claire Day was an American internationally syndicated gag-a-day comic strip by Creators Syndicate, created by Henry Beckett and Carla Ventresca and launched in 2006. The strip ended its run in print and online on June 14, 2014, to continue on the mobile device service Comikka. According to its creators, there was discussion on it being developed into a television show.

The strip follows the life of fictional character Claire Bennett, an insecure and naive young woman, who has left her parents' home to live on her own. She is visited frequently by Sammi, her elegant, financially savvy, and impatient best friend; Jeff, her guy's guy neighbor, who's happy working construction and doesn't understand Claire's ambition or life issues; her "out there" Oprah-fanatic mom and her "work hard or you're worth nothing" dad; and the perfect neighbors, Pasha and James, who seem to do everything with an ease and flair Claire can't achieve or imagine possessing herself. But she managed to settle down in with a life with medical researcher Paul along with their dog Bradley and cat Lulu and at the end of the series were engaged.
