= Ballard Street =

Ballard Street was an American comic panel created by Jerry Van Amerongen and distributed by Creators Syndicate that ran between 1991 and 2019.

== About the comic ==
The panel featured numerous characters; some recurring faces are Dottie and Will Farrington, the neighborhood skipping aficionados, Millie, who earnestly lectures the naughty person inside herself, and Scooter, the dog who loves to take baths, but only with his scuba gear.

In April 2004, Jerry's Giclee Prints and some original pieces were presented during a one-man show at the Every Picture Tells A Story Gallery in Santa Monica, CA. In May 2006 Ballard Street was awarded the Best Newspaper Cartoon Panel of the Year Award by the National Cartoonist Society. Ballard Street was awarded the same honor in 2004.

The final Ballard Street ran on March 30, 2019.

== Pre-Ballard Street: The Neighborhood ==
From 1980 to 1990, Jerry Van Amerongen’s cartoon panel, The Neighborhood, appeared in the comic pages of newspapers across the country. Van Amerongen discontinued The Neighborhood and began Ballard Street in 1991. It ran in strip form for nearly two years before returning to the single panel format.
