= Herb and Jamaal =

American comic strip by Stephen Bentley

- Author: Stephen Bentley
- Current status/schedule: current daily & Sunday strip
- Launch date: 1989; 37 years ago
- Syndicate: Creators Syndicate
- Genre: Humor

Herb and Jamaal is a comic strip by Stephen Bentley syndicated by Creators Syndicate. It is published daily and centers on the eponymous friends who own and run a diner together, inspired by the illustrator's experience at a high school reunion, and a desire to provide increased representation for black people in comics. According to Bentley, "Some of the characters in Herb and Jamaal partially come from myself and people that I know but the full story is just a fantasy..."

== Story and characters ==
The strip centers around the title characters and the diner they own and run together:

- Herbert Johnson, a former quality control technician at the gas works, a schemer, but not underhanded.
- Jamaal J. Jamaal, a former NBA center for the Phazers (a fictional team).

Other characters:

- Sarah Johnson, Herb's wife, whose cooking leaves a lot to be desired.
- Uhuru Johnson, Herb and Sarah's daughter.
- Ezekiel Johnson, Herb and Sarah's son. His middle name is Nicholas.
- Eula, Sarah's mother, who never hesitates to let Herb know what she thinks of him.
- Yolanda, the object of Jamaal's fawning affection. The feeling is only somewhat reciprocated.
- Kim, a postal worker.
- Mr. C, a blond customer who often visits the diner. Bentley said that Mr. C's name began as Charles to honor a childhood friend. However, some took it to be a derogatory reference ("Mister Charlie" was used within the African American community to refer to an imperious white man or a man in charge), so he shortened it. He now thinks of it as C for Common.
- Ed, a curly-haired diner patron.
- Reverend Croom
- Deacon Derek
- Ernie, a taxi driver who always wears sunglasses.
