= Ask Shagg =

- Author: Peter Guren
- Website: AskShagg.com
- Current status/schedule: Concluded
- Launch date: 1980; 46 years ago
- End date: 2020; 6 years ago
- Syndicate(s): Creators Syndicate (1995–2020); United Feature Syndicate (1980–1995)
- Publisher: Ballantine Books
- Genre: Animals

Ask Shagg was a syndicated daily comic strip drawn by cartoonist Peter Guren from 1980 to 2020. It was distributed by Creators Syndicate; it had been distributed by United Feature Syndicate from 1980 until 1995. The strip has run in dozens of newspapers including The Boston Globe, The Columbus Dispatch, and the Seattle Post-Intelligencer. In each strip Guren, through his Shagg E. Dawg character, answered questions from readers about the animal kingdom. The strip retired on 5 January 2020.

== Characters and story ==
The strip featured lead character Shagg E. Dawg answering questions about animals that were sent in by readers. Questions about particular animals are sometimes answered by the strip's other characters, Rosko the cat, Mouth the myna bird, and Slippy the flying squirrel. In 1995 Guren was receiving more than 15,000 letters a year, with about 75% of them from children. Readers received a free Shagg doll if their question appeared in the strip.

The strips generally featured a joke of some sort about the subject animal in addition to providing an accurate answer to the day's question. For example, one strip answered a question about hamsters storing food in their cheeks and then compared it to a human carrying their money in their mouths. The last panel then showed a picture of a person holding their money in their mouth.

== Community service ==
Guren has often used Ask Shagg to raise money or awareness for causes. His Shagg E. Dawg character was used on information cards about endangered species that were included with kid's meals from Wendy's fast-food restaurants in 1993.

== Website ==
Guren launched his first Ask Shagg website in May 1996 and began putting the site's address in the newspaper version of his strip. The site AskShagg.com features a search engine with which users can search for "Ask Shagg" comic strips with questions about a particular animal.

== Book ==
In 1985 World Almanac Publications published the book Ask Shagg, with the attribution "by Shagg E. Dawg as told to Peter Guren". It was distributed in the United States by Ballantine Books.
