= Agnes (comic strip) =

Comic strip by Tony Cochran

- Agnes (L) and Trout (R)
- Author: Tony Cochran
- Current status/schedule: Running
- Launch date: March 8, 1999
- End date: January 1, 2023
- Syndicate(s): Creators Syndicate
- Genre: Humor

Agnes is an American syndicated comic strip written and drawn by Tony Cochran. It was first syndicated in 1999. It is currently syndicated by Creators Syndicate.

== Overview ==
Agnes chronicles the adventures of an elementary school-aged girl living in an Ohio trailer park called "The People's Court" with her kind yet weary grandmother (whom Agnes refers to as "Granma"). It has not been revealed what happened to Agnes' parents or how she came to be in her grandmother's custody. Agnes is poor and not what one would consider a classical beauty, yet is a dreamer and schemer, whose limitless imagination and ambitions are constantly brought down to Earth by her limited resources and social standing.

Agnes is constantly confronted with the harsh realities of the life of the poor working class but still manages to find the optimism to carry on, frequently with a bit of sarcasm and wit using surprisingly sophisticated vocabulary.

A typical strip will show Agnes finding new schemes in hopes of getting rich or attaining celebrity, or just using her imagination to get through everyday terrors and frustrations. Although quite intelligent, Agnes does not do well in school; she frequently exasperates her teachers and finds herself in the principal's office. Her social interactions are generally limited to Granma and neighbor/schoolmate/confidant Trout, both of whom constantly pop the balloon of Agnes' dreams with hard facts and wisdom.

Tony Cochran retired from making the strip in 2023, leading it to enter reruns.

== Main characters ==
=== Agnes ===
Within a body consisting of skinny legs, a large nose and huge spectacles covering the majority of her face lays the creative mind and indomitable spirit of the strip's protagonist, Agnes. Born into poverty and seemingly abandoned by her biological parents she has lived a nomadic life with her grandmother in a rather old and decidedly sparse trailer. Having settled down on the fringe of an un-specified town she is also on the fringe of life. Agnes does not accept or believe that she will always remain unattractive, poor and a social outcast; quite the contrary, she can imagine a multitude of scenarios that will allow her to escape her humdrum existence.

The heir apparent to a long history of American hucksters, Agnes can seemingly find potential profit and fame from items one would usually consign to the garbage dump. She is always going from one "get rich quick" scheme to another, be it a medical breakthrough (one of her inventions was a balm for bugs) or a new untried, unheard-of fashion accessory. She also attempts to create new characters and mascots for various holidays, most famously "Kaloopa Queen of the Snow Leopards," who she hopes will become a new symbol of Christmas.

Acutely aware of her personal aesthetic limitations, she frequently hopes that Granma will buy her various high-fashion garments or shoes, though is usually limited to whatever Granma can find that is practical and on sale. Agnes' lack of marks of classical beauty are emphasized by her inanimate yet frequent companion, a Barbie-like doll named "Miss Glitter".

=== Granma ===
Granma

Practical and pragmatic, Agnes' grandmother most likely did not imagine her golden years being spent living in a trailer, working a dead-end factory job and raising her precocious granddaughter. Granma's no-nonsense way of dealing with life's everyday disasters is described by Agnes as "mixing tragedy and farce." Barely eking along from small-paycheck-to-small-paycheck, she still manages to keep Agnes reasonably fed and clothed, though certainly not to her granddaughter's fantastical standards. Poor but proud, Granma may live in an old trailer but insists on it being kept neat and tidy, much to Agnes' (who especially despises folding towels and having to make her bed) chagrin.

=== Trout ===
Agnes' best friend and trailer court neighbor, the tomboyish Trout is a foil to Agnes' dreaming. Trout seems to be happy with what life has handed her, but frequently will go along with Agnes' latest scheme — generally because there really isn't that much else to do in their world. Easily satisfied with what she has yet quick to point out hard logic and facts to Agnes, Trout is a loyal friend.
