= Daddy's Home (comic strip) =

American comic strip

Daddy's Home is a daily comic strip which premiered in American newspapers on March 10, 2008, and is syndicated by Creators Syndicate. The strip can currently be seen in large market newspapers such as the Orange County Register. The strip is written by Tony Rubino and illustrated by Gary Markstein, a features designer with the Milwaukee Journal Sentinel.

== Plot summary ==
Daddy's Home deals with a family where the father, Pete, is a copywriter who works out of his home office and is a stay-at-home dad to his son Elliot, while his wife Peggy is out in the working world. Events occurring in the comic strip are usually humorous and involve Pete and Peggy trying to make sense out of their living arrangements and finding time for each other, Elliot's own adventures with his best friend, next door neighbor Maria, and Pete trying to write on his computer, which is sentient and able to talk back to him as he deals with writer's block. Launched in April 2008 and with a combined circulation of more than 10 million readers, "Daddy's Home" is considered to be one of the most rapidly growing comic strips in the world.

== Characters ==
- Pete, the main character and Elliot's dad. Is a copywriter
- Peggy, mother of Elliot.
- Elliot, son of Pete and Peggy
- Maria, Elliot's best friend, next door neighbor.
