= Rubes =

American newspaper cartoon

- Author(s): Leigh Rubin
- Website: www.rubescartoons.com
- Current status/schedule: Running
- Launch date: November 1, 1984, (syndication) January 1989
- Syndicate(s): Creators Syndicate
- Genre(s): Humor

Rubes is a syndicated newspaper single-panel cartoon created by Leigh Rubin on November 1, 1984.

== Publication history ==
Leigh Rubin began making and distributing his own greeting cards in 1979 through his company Rubes. The cartoon Rubes began appearing in newspapers in 1984 and is since January 1989 syndicated by Creators Syndicate to over 400 newspapers worldwide, and was published in paperbacks from 1988 on. It was pulled from the Brigham Young University student newspaper The Daily Universe after several complaints by readers, but seems to have attracted little controversy otherwise.

Being a popular cartoon, Rubes is also heavily merchandised, with calendars, greeting cards, mugs, and T-shirts.

Rubes hasn't won any of the major comics or cartoon awards, but has won a few minor awards like a bronze award at ForeWord magazine’s Book of the Year.

== Publications ==
=== Books (collections) ===
- The Penguin is Mightier than the Swordfish. Fragments West / Valentine Press, 1987. ISBN 978-0-916063-15-3
- Rubes. Penguin Group, 1988. ISBN 978-0-399-51488-3
- Sharks Are People Too! Rubes Publications, 1990. ISBN 978-0-943384-02-3
- Calves Can Be So Cruel: The Best of Rubes Cartoons. Penguin Group, 1990. ISBN 978-0-452-26509-7
- Rubes Calves Can Be So Cruel. Ravette Publishing, 1992. ISBN 978-1-85304-430-4
- Rubes Bible Cartoons. Hendrickson Publishers, 1999. ISBN 978-1-56563-423-7
- Rubes Then & Now: Cartoons for the Millennium and Beyond! Image Maker Publishing, 1999. ISBN 978-0-9644695-4-9
- The Wild Life of Dogs: A Rubes Cartoon Book. BowTie Press, 2003. ISBN 978-1-889540-98-6
- The Wild Life of Pets: A Rubes Cartoon Book. BowTie Press, 2003. ISBN 978-1-889540-99-3
- The Wild Life of Cows: A Rubes Cartoon Book. BowTie Press, 2003. ISBN 978-1-931993-36-4
- The Wild Life of Farm Animals: A Rubes Cartoon Book. BowTie Press, 2003. ISBN 978-1-931993-37-1
- The Wild Life of Cats: A Rubes Cartoon Book. Willow Creek Press, 2005. ISBN 978-1-59543-233-9
- The Wild Life of Love: A Rubes Cartoon Collection. Willow Creek Press, 2006. ISBN 978-1-59543-368-8
- The Wild and Twisted World of Rubes: A Rubes Cartoon Collection. Andrews McMeel Publishing, 2010. ISBN 978-0-7407-9156-7

=== Calendars ===
- Rubes Farm Animal Funnies Family Organizer 2006 (Wall) Calendar. Willow Creek Press, 2005. ISBN 978-1-59543-230-8
- Rubes Zoo in a Box 2006 Daily Box Calendar. Willow Creek Press, 2005. ISBN 978-1-59543-182-0
- Rubes Animal Antics Family Organizer 2007 (Wall) Calendar. Willow Creek Press, 2006. ISBN 978-1-59543-323-7
- Rubes Zoo in a Box 2007 Daily Box Calendar. Willow Creek Press, 2006. ISBN 978-1-59543-416-6
- Rubes Animal Antics Family Organizer 2008 (Wall) Calendar. Willow Creek Press, 2007. ISBN 978-1-59543-499-9
- Rubes Zoo in a Box 2008 Daily Box Calendar. Willow Creek Press, 2007. ISBN 978-1-59543-624-5
- Rubes Zoo in a Box 2009 Daily Box Calendar. Willow Creek Press, 2008. ISBN 978-1-59543-831-7
- Rubes Zoo in a Box 2010 Daily Box Calendar. Willow Creek Press, 2009. ISBN 978-1-60755-046-4
- Rubes Zoo in a Box 2011 Daily Box Calendar. Willow Creek Press, 2010. ISBN 978-1-60755-246-8
- Rubes 2012 (Wall) Calendar. Day Dream Publishing, 2011. ISBN 978-1-4238-1135-0
- Rubes Zoo in a Box 2012 Daily Box Calendar. Mead, 2011. ISBN 978-1-4238-1240-1
- Rubes Zoo in a Box 2013 Daily Box Calendar. Mead, 2012. ISBN 978-1-4238-1612-6

=== Mega Mini Kits ===
- Rubes Cow Tipping: You Can't Keep a Good Cow Down! Running Press, 2011. ISBN 978-0-7624-4008-5
