= The Other Coast =

Canadian comic strip

The Other Coast is a Canadian comic strip, drawn by Adrian Raeside. It originally launched in 1993 as a Sunday strip in the Times Colonist under the title Toulouse, then expanded into a daily strip under the title The Left Coast in 2000. It has been syndicated by the Creator's Syndicate since 2001. It is syndicated to more than 150 newspapers worldwide. The strip blends environmental, political, and animal rights issues with comedy.

== Collections ==
- The Other Coast: Road Rage in Beverly Hills (2004); ISBN 0-7407-5450-5
- This Is Your First Rock Garden, Isn't It?: An Other Coast Collection (2005); ISBN 0-7407-4668-5
