= Speed Bump =

Single-panel cartoon

- Author(s): Dave Coverly
- Current status/schedule: Concluded daily & Sunday single-panel strip
- Launch date: 1994; 31 years ago
- Syndicate(s): Creators Syndicate
- Genre(s): Humor

Speed Bump is a single-panel comic series by Dave Coverly, syndicated since 1994 by Creators Syndicate.

Describing his cartoons, Coverly commented, "Basically," he says, "if life were a movie, these would be the outtakes."

Speed Bump is published in more than 400 newspapers and websites, including The Washington Post, Toronto Globe and Mail, Detroit Free Press, Chicago Tribune, Indianapolis Star, Cleveland Plain Dealer, The Cincinnati Enquirer, New Orleans Times-Picayune, St. Louis Post-Dispatch, The Vancouver Sun, The Baltimore Sun and The Arizona Republic.

== Awards ==
Coverly won the National Cartoonists Society's Newspaper Panel Cartoon Award for 1994 and 2002, with an additional nomination for 2000. Coverly won the Society's Reuben Award in 2008.

== Books ==
Title	Publication Month	Publisher	ISBN
Speed Bump	May 2000	Andrews McMeel Publishing	ISBN 978-0-7407-0599-1
Speed Bump: Cartoons for Idea People	November 2004	ECW Press	ISBN 978-1-55022-658-4
Just One %$#@ Speed Bump After Another... More Cartoons	November 2005	ECW Press	ISBN 978-1-55022-700-0
