= One Big Happy (comic strip) =

Comic strip

- Cover of first One Big Happy anthology, published in 1996.
- Author(s): Rick Detorie
- Current status/schedule: Running
- Launch date: September 11, 1988
- Syndicate(s): Creators Syndicate
- Publisher(s): NBM Publishing
- Genre(s): Humor

One Big Happy is an American daily comic strip written and illustrated by Rick Detorie, detailing the daily adventures of a six-year-old girl named Ruthie. The strip also features her eight-year-old brother Joe, their parents Frank and Ellen, and their grandparents Nick and Rose, who live next door. The strip's title is a takeoff on the phrase "One big happy family." It debuted on September 11, 1988. The strip takes place on Buena Vista Avenue in an unspecified city based on Baltimore, Maryland, where the creator grew up. It is syndicated by Creators Syndicate.

The strip focuses on the daily lives of the children and their interactions with their family, friends and neighbors. Grandparents Nick and Rose are featured often, as they live next door and have a close relationship with the kids. Together they watch television, play cards, bake, and participate in imaginative games. Ruthie often visits the local public library for story hour with the Library Lady, and annoys her with ceaseless questions and variations on her own tales. At school Ruthie dodges the affections of occasionally seen classmate Buggy Crispino (who thinks of himself as a ladies' man and has even complimented Ruthie's mom on her appearance), argues with her snotty rich friend Cylene, and plays with Joe and their ditzy friend James, a poor (and usually dirty) kid who lives down the street.

The strip has a number of recurring themes. Ruthie runs her own art business, which she sets up in a stand with a sign that reads "Good Art By Ruthie, 10 cents" (the price was raised in the early 2000s from 5 cents). Ruthie also frequently misunderstands and misuses words she hears. Joe has a better handle on words, but often has trouble spelling them. Grandma Rose has a tendency to meddle in other people's business and gossip, while Nick and Frank tell tall tales to entertain the children. Ellen operates a pottery business in the house.

Originally the creator included two sets of grandparents, but reduced it to only one (Frank's side), with the other—and more eccentric—grandmother, Myrna, making guest appearances. Joe's name was originally Frankie, but was changed to one that would take up less space. Ruthie was created as a dark-haired little girl to balance the blond-haired little boys that were already popular in the comic pages.

Joe describes his family as being "half Italian and half Texan". The Italian half comes from Nick, Rose, and Frank. Their family name is Lombard, a slightly Americanized version of the Italian family name Lombardo. Myrna and Ellen supply the Texan side. All the family members are colorful characters with strong opinions on everything. The same can be said for their neighbors. The most regular neighbor is an old lady named Avis, gossipy and characterized by a perennial grin from ear to ear, who often meets Rose, Nick and/or Ruthie; the elderly couple only tolerate her for appearances, but do not think highly of her gossiping.

The last new Sunday strip was published on December 25, 2022. After that, the Sunday was replaced with reruns while new daily strips continued to be published. The last new daily strip was published December 30, 2023, after which the daily strip was also replaced by reruns. No official announcement has been made regarding whether the comic is retired or on hiatus.

== Characters ==
- Ruthie Lombard, The main character, a 6-year-old girl.
- Joe Lombard, Ruthie's older brother, he is 8 years old.
- Ellen Lombard, Mother of Ruthie and Joe.
- Frank Lombard, Father of Ruthie and Joe.
- Nick “Grandpa” Lombard, Frank's father and the family's next-door neighbor.
- Rose “Grandma” Lombard, Nick's wife and Frank's mother.
- Willie, Ruthie's pet dog.
- Buggy Crispino, a little kid who "seduces" any female he can. He appeared on April 12, 2010 — in a ladybug costume with a hat and goggles.
- James, rough-hewn friend to both Lombard kids.
- Cylene, pretentious schoolmate from a rich family and occasional playmate of the Lombard children.
- Library Lady, leads story time at the local branch library.
- Playground Lady, playground monitor who often deals with Ruthie's naivete.
- Crowy or Clever Crows, Ruth's semi-independent pet.

== Collections ==
All books published by NBM Publishing.

- Should I Spit on Him? (1997) ISBN 1-56163-172-8
- None of This Fun Is My Fault! (1998) ISBN 1-56163-217-1
- Nice Costs Extra! (1999) ISBN 1-56163-239-2
- All the Dirt! (2001) ISBN 1-56163-280-5
