= Creators Syndicate =

American media distributor

Coordinates: 33°51′26″N 118°23′29″W

Creators
- Type: Print and digital syndicate
- Industry: News articles, News Columns, Comics
- Founded: February 13, 1987
- Founder: Richard S. Newcombe
- Headquarters: Hermosa Beach, California, U.S.
- Key people: Richard S. Newcombe - Founder/CEO; Jack Newcombe - President; Melissa Lin - Vice President of Business Affairs; Marianne Sugawara - Vice President of Operations; Simone Slykhous - Managing Editor
- Website: creators.com

Creators Syndicate (also known as Creators) is an American independent distributor of comic strips and syndicated columns to daily newspapers, websites, and other digital outlets. When founded in 1987, Creators Syndicate became one of the few successful independent syndicates founded since the 1930s and was the first syndicate to allow cartoonists ownership rights to their work. Creators Syndicate is based in Hermosa Beach, California.

== History ==
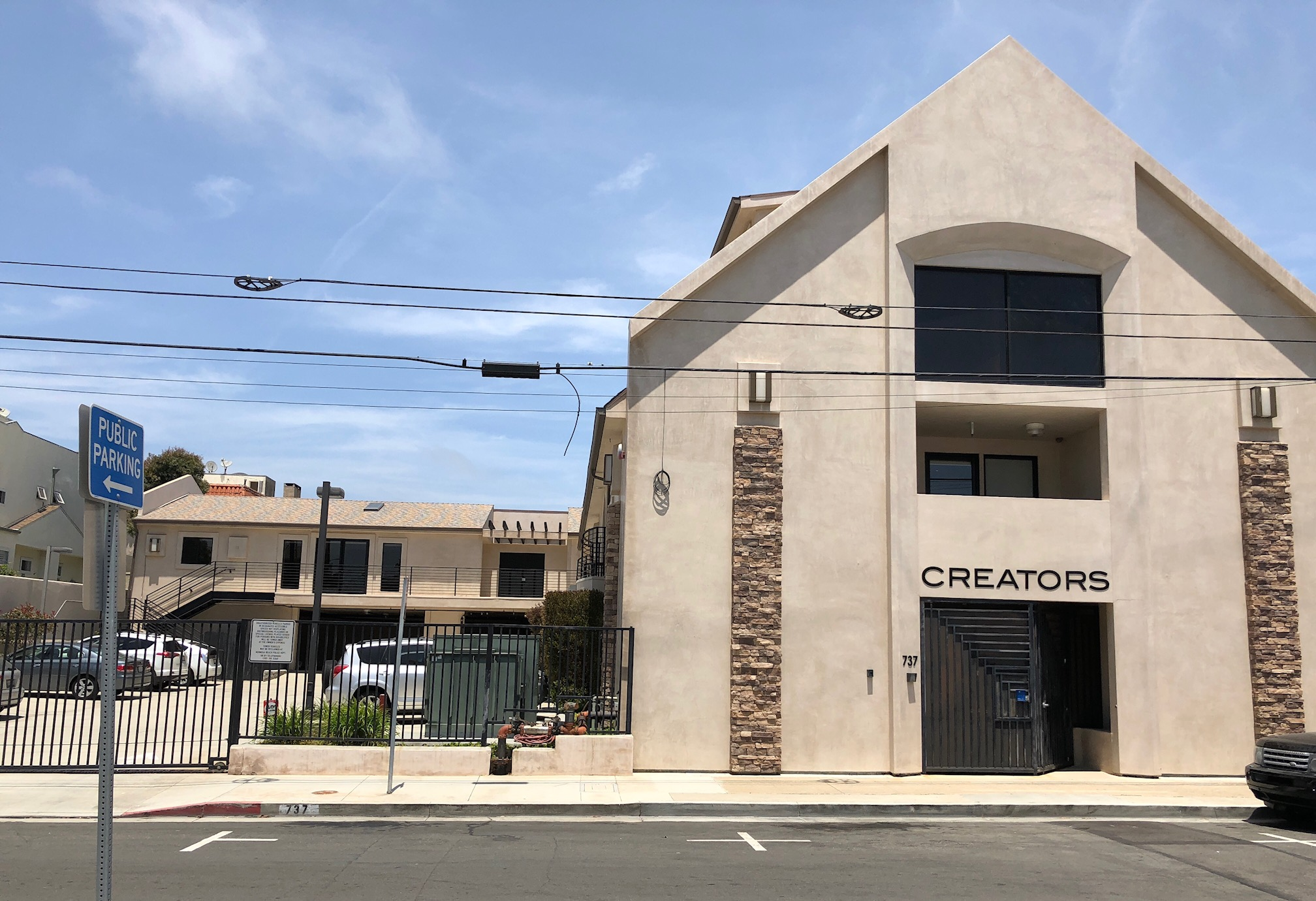
The Creators Syndicate headquarters in Hermosa Beach, California

Creators Syndicate was founded on February 13, 1987, following the December 24, 1986-announced sale of the Irvine, California-based News America Syndicate to King Features Syndicate, a print syndication company owned by The Hearst Corporation. The pending sale of News America Syndicate, which was first reported by Advertising Age in October 1986, prompted 36-year-old News America Syndicate president Richard S. Newcombe to leave NAS in January 1987 and use financial backing from London-based publisher Robert Maxwell to form Creators Syndicate before the close of the NAS sale.

Ann Landers, then the world's most widely syndicated newspaper columnist, also announced that she was leaving NAS to join the newly formed Creators Syndicate. Within a month, Creators Syndicate acquired the syndication rights to the enormously popular comic strip B.C., and a few months after that acquired the syndication rights to the cartoon works of Herblock, an American editorial cartoonist and author known for his commentary on domestic and foreign policy.

Milton Caniff was another of several important cartoonists who had tried unsuccessfully to secure rights to their creations. In 1946, he walked away from the enormously popular Terry and the Pirates comic strip because his syndicate insisted that they own his creation. After Creators Syndicate was founded, Caniff sent Newcombe a postcard saying, “To put it on the record: Hooray!!!" Pulitzer Prize-winning cartoonist Mike Peters told Editor & Publisher magazine, "It's long overdue that syndicates realize a new day is here. Indentured servitude went out in the 1500s." Johnny Hart, creator of B.C. and The Wizard of Id, called Creators “a history-making venture in syndication." Bil Keane, creator of The Family Circus, described Creators Syndicate as "the first breath of fresh air the syndicates have had in 100 years of existence." The New York Times ran a story about Newcombe with the headline, “A Superhero for Cartoonists?” Today, largely as a result of Creators Syndicate, all syndicates grant cartoonists ownership rights to their work.

In 1991 Creators Syndicate took over Heritage Features Syndicate, part of The Heritage Foundation. In 2008, Creators Syndicate acquired the Copley News Service, a wire service that distributed news, political cartoons, and opinion columns.

In 2011, Jack Newcombe became president of Creators Syndicate, and together with Rick Newcombe started Creators Publishing and Sumner Books, which have published more than 150 titles.

In 2012, after 25 years of operating in the city of Los Angeles, Creators Syndicate moved to nearby Hermosa Beach because of a tax dispute with the city.

Since 2012, Creators has expanded its business to include Creators Publishing, Alpha Comedy, a literary and lifestyle magazine, a political website, a podcast network, and Sumner Books, an e-book and audiobook publishing company.

== Creators Syndicate strips and panels ==
=== Current (as of 2024) ===
- Agnes
- Andy Capp
- Archie
- Ask Shagg
- Ballard Street
- The Barn
- Daddy's Home
- Diamond Lil
- Dog Eat Doug
- Dogs of C-Kennel
- Doodles
- Flo & Friends
- For Heaven's Sake
- Free Range
- Heathcliff
- Herb and Jamaal
- Liberty Meadows
- Long Story Short
- MazeToons
- The Meaning of Lila
- Momma (1987–2016; in reruns) — inherited from Field Newspaper Syndicate, who got it from Publishers-Hall Syndicate, where it originally debuted in 1970
- Nest Heads
- One Big Happy
- The Other Coast
- Rubes
- Rugrats (1998–2003; in reruns)
- Scary Gary
- Spectickles
- Speed Bump
- Strange Brew
- Wee Pals (c. 1987–2014; in reruns) — inherited from United Feature Syndicate, who got it from the Register and Tribune Syndicate, who got it from Lew Little Enterprises, where it originally debuted in 1965
- The Wizard of Id
- Working it Out
- Zack Hill

=== Discontinued strips ===
- Cafe con Leche
- Chuckle Bros (2006–2017)
- The Dinette Set (c. 2006–2010) — inherited from King Features; taken over by United Features where it concluded in 2015
- Donald Duck (reruns syndicated through 2015)
- Flare
- Flight Deck
- Girls & Sports (2006–2011)
- Home Office
- Hope & Death
- Mickey Mouse (reruns syndicated through 2015)
- Natural Selection
- Off Center
- On a Claire Day (2006–2014)
- The Quigmans by Buddy Hickerson (1986–2011)
- Recess
- State of the Union
- Thatch
- Thin Lines
- Winnie the Pooh (reruns syndicated until April 2010) — inherited from King Features

== Political cartoonists ==
- Steve Benson
- Chip Bok
- A. F. Branco
- Steve Breen
- Chris Britt
- John Deering
- Al Goodwyn
- Bob Gorrell
- Steve Kelley
- Mike Luckovich
- Gary Markstein
- Andy Marlette
- Michael Ramirez
- Marshall Ramsey
- Tom Stiglich
- Gary Varvel
