= Jay Kennedy =

American magazine editor and writer (1956–2007)

- Born: April 18, 1956; Toledo, Ohio
- Died: March 15, 2007 (aged 50); Costa Rica
- Education: School of Visual Arts; University of Wisconsin–Madison
- Occupations: Editor, Writer
- Employer: King Features (1988–2007, his death)
- Known for: The Official Underground and Newave Comix Price Guide; King Features Syndicate
- Spouse: Sarah Jewler

Jay Malcolm Kennedy (April 18, 1956 – March 15, 2007) was an American editor and writer. The author of The Official Underground and Newave Comix Price Guide, he was a long-time editor at King Features Syndicate, eventually rising to the position of editor-in-chief.

Kennedy wrote articles about the history of cartooning, and he profiled cartoonists and contemporary comics for magazines, including New Age Journal, Heavy Metal, New York and Escape Magazine, an English bi-monthly. His interest in cartooning, he once explained, was because:

In the fine arts, artists generally comment on the world only obliquely; and sadly, only those people who have the leisure to study art history can fully appreciate their comments. By contrast, cartoons are an art form accessible to all people. They can simply laugh at the jokes or look beyond them to see the artist's view of the world. Cartoons are multileveled art accessible to everyone at whatever level they choose to enjoy.

== Life and career ==
Born in Toledo, Ohio, Kennedy grew up in Ridgewood, New Jersey, working in a picture frame store while he was in high school. After studying sculpting and conceptual art at New York's School of Visual Arts, Kennedy graduated with a sociology degree from the University of Wisconsin–Madison. At the University he was an active member of the Pail & Shovel Party, a student group dedicated to bringing humor to student government via absurdist and playful pranks. Kennedy drew posters and flyers for the group and took part in many activities, including the famous Pink Flamingo planting.

Kennedy was the author of The Official Underground and Newave Comix Price Guide (Boatner Norton Press, 1982), the first price guide to the underground comix of the 1960s and 1970s. Much of the information in that book was based on Kennedy's personal collection of more than 9,500 comix.

From 1983 to 1988, he served as cartoon editor of Esquire where he edited and co-wrote Lynda Barry's Modern Romance. At the same time, Kennedy was a humor book agent as well as a cartoon consultant and editor for magazines and publishers, including People and Whittle Communications. In 1985, he was a guest editor for the “European Humor” issue released by the National Lampoon.

He joined King Features Syndicate in 1988 as deputy comics editor and became comics editor one year later. He began as King Features' editor-in-chief in 1997. He made a point of championing strips created by female cartoonists, including Hilary B. Price's Rhymes with Orange, Sandra Bell-Lundy's Between Friends, and Rina Piccolo's Tina's Groove; as well as Six Chix, a rotating series of female-made strips. In 2006, Kennedy introduced King Features' DailyINK, an online service that costs $19.99 annually and makes available, on a web page and via email, more than 90 vintage and current comic strips, puzzles and editorial cartoons. The vintage strips have included Bringing Up Father, Buz Sawyer, Flash Gordon, Krazy Kat, The Little King, The Phantom and Rip Kirby.

== Death ==
Kennedy, who lived in New York City and Orient Point, Long Island, died March 15, 2007, while vacationing in Costa Rica. He drowned after having been caught in a riptide. His wife, Sarah Jewler, the managing editor of New York magazine, had died in 2005. King Features appointed associate editor Brendan Burford to the position of comics editor on April 23, 2007.

Kennedy's memorial service, held in Manhattan in mid-April 2007, was attended by notables from the world of cartooning and comics, including Bunny Hoest, John Reiner, Sam Gross, Jules Feiffer, Mort Gerberg, Isabella Bannerman, Rina Piccolo, Irwin Hasen, Jim Salicrup, Maggie Thompson, Chris Browne, Arnie Roth, Dan Piraro, Jim Borgman, Mike Lynch, Mort Walker, Patrick McDonnell, and Matt Groening.

== Legacy ==
In memory of Kennedy, King Features established the Jay Kennedy Memorial Scholarship Fund, which is "designed to acknowledge excellence among college-aged aspiring cartoonists". Through the National Cartoonists Society Foundation, the Jay Kennedy Memorial Scholarship is awarded yearly to a deserving college student for their junior or senior year based on the judging of submitted work to the Foundation’s panel of professional cartoonists. The award is presented at the annual NCS Reuben Awards dinner.

Kennedy's underground comix collection was later donated to the Billy Ireland Cartoon Library & Museum.
