= Radio Patrol =

Radio Patrol may refer to:

- Radio Patrol (comic strip), a 1933–1950 police comic strip
- Radio Patrol (serial), a 1937 Universal movie serial based on the comic strip
- Radio Patrol (1932 film), an American pre-Code crime film
- Radio Patrol (1951 film), a Mexican crime drama film
