= Jay Stephens =

Canadian cartoonist

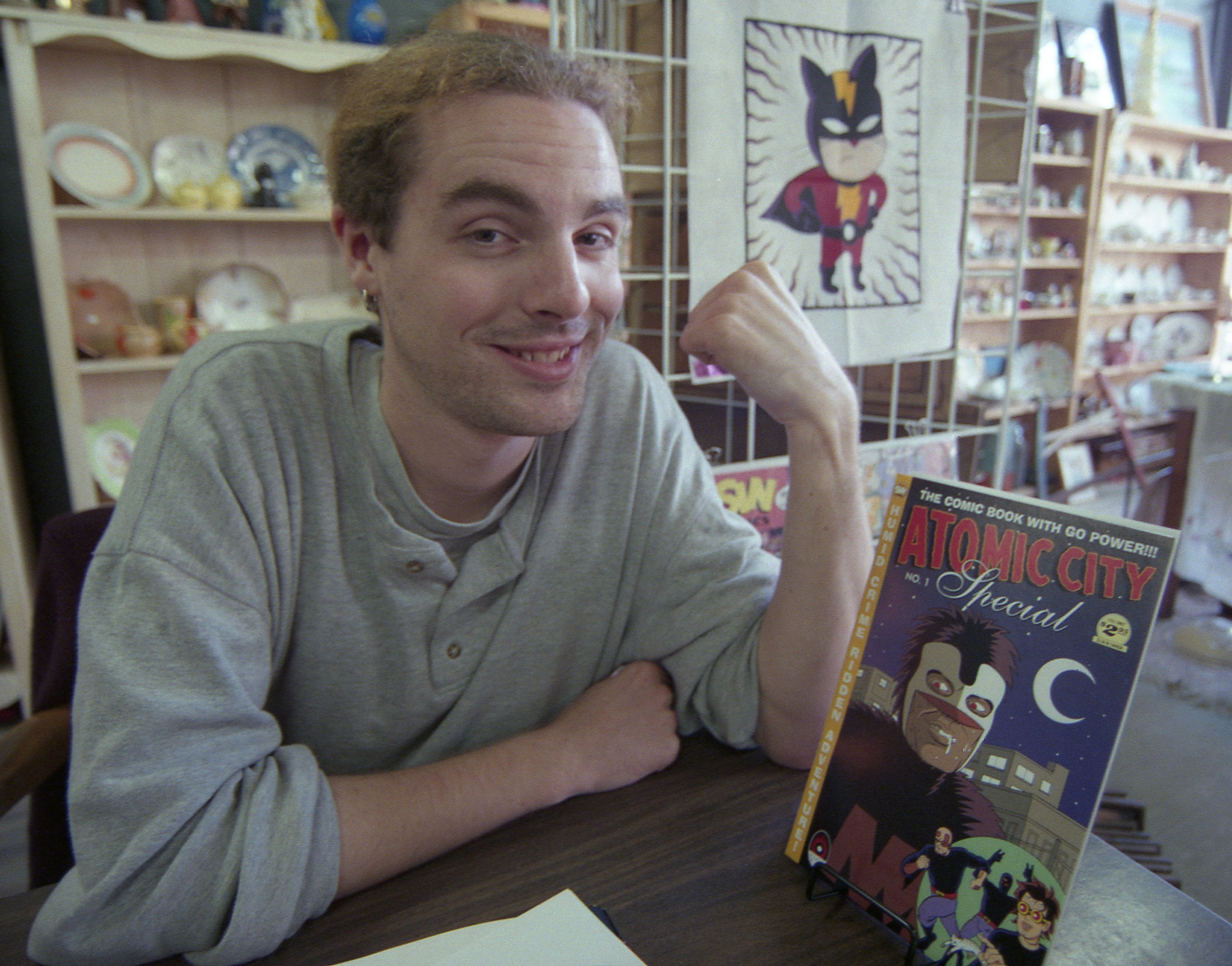
- Stephens in 1994
- Born: March 22, 1971 (age 55) Toronto, Ontario, Canada
- Area: Cartoonist

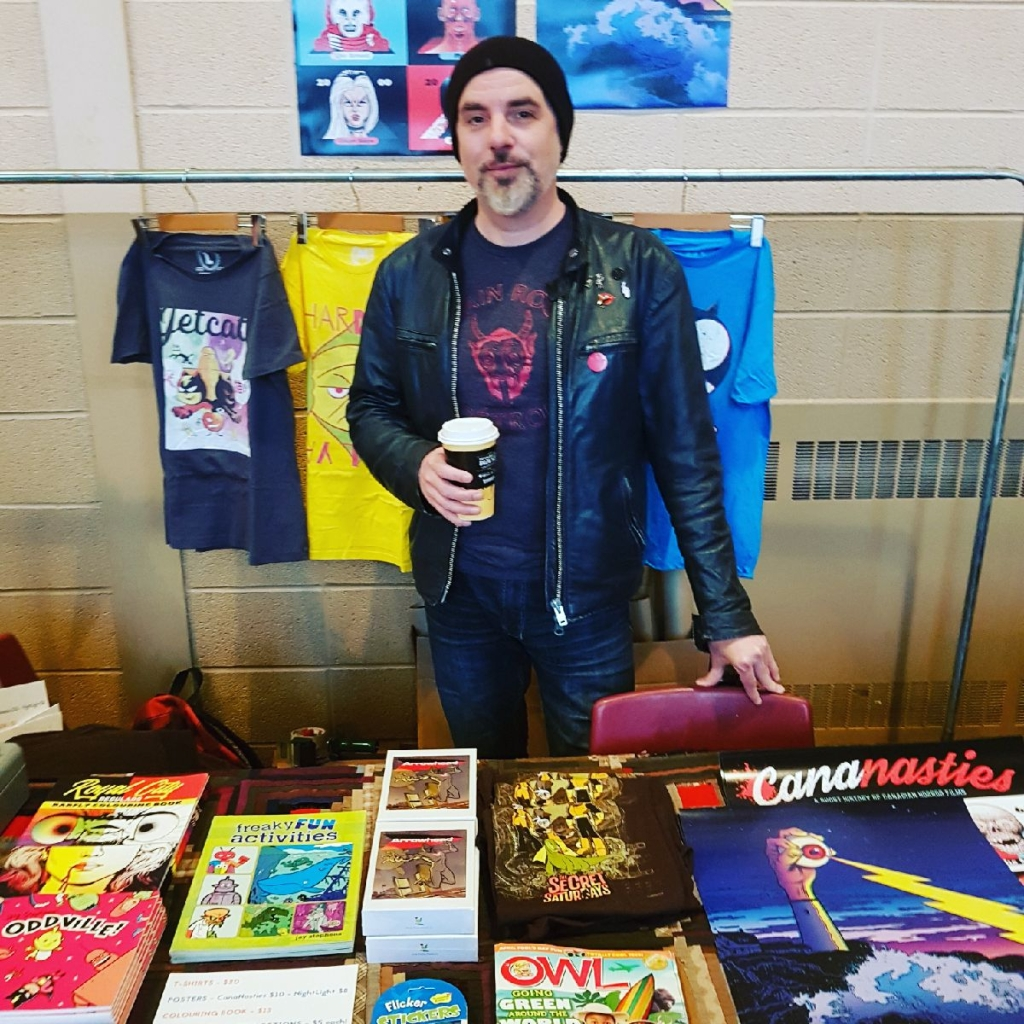
Stephens at the Kazoo!Print Expo, 2018

Jay Stephens (born March 22, 1971) is a Canadian cartoonist and animator currently living in Guelph, Ontario. He is best known as the creator of the comic Tutenstein, which was later adapted into the Discovery Kids animated television series of the same name, as well as the creator of Cartoon Network's animated television series The Secret Saturdays, and the JetCat animated shorts for Nickelodeon's anthology series, KaBlam!.

Aside from his work in animation, Stephens is known for several comic book projects, including SIN, The Land of Nod, Atomic City Tales, and Jetcat Clubhouse, and has written and drawn for licensed properties such as Alien, Star Wars, Felix the Cat, and Teen Titans. He is the author of several drawing books for children, including Monsters!: Draw Your Own Mutants, Freaks & Creeps, Heroes!: Draw Your Own Superheroes, Gadget Geeks & Other Do-Gooders, Robots!: Draw Your Own Androids, Cyborgs & Fighting Bots, and Freaky Fun Activities. Stephens is the creator of the comic strips Oddville!, Chick & Dee (for Chickadee magazine), Xtra-curricular (for OWL magazine), and the short-lived daily newspaper strip Oh, Brother! with Slylock Fox creator Bob Weber Jr.

In 2021, Stephens began his award-winning, "high-concept" horror series Dwellings, published by Black Eye Books. The series has since been collected and reissued by Oni Press.

In 2024, Stephens created the series Figgy Furthermore for a revamped Gold Key Comics.
