= Hilary B. Price =

American cartoonist

- Born: 1969 (age 56–57); Weston, Massachusetts, U.S.
- Education: Stanford University
- Occupation: Comics artist
- Awards: Inkpot Award (2015); Reuben Award (2023)
- Website: http://www.rhymeswithorange.com

Hilary B. Price (born 1969) is an American cartoonist. She is known for creating the comic strip Rhymes with Orange, which is published digitally on her website and in over one hundred newspapers across the United States. At the age of 25, she became the youngest female cartoonist ever to be nationally syndicated. She won the Silver Reuben for "Best Newspaper Panel Cartoon" from the National Cartoonists Society four times, in 2007, 2009, 2012, and 2014.

== Early life and career beginnings ==
Price was born in Weston, Massachusetts, the youngest of three children of a "progressive social worker" mother and a "conservative businessman" father. After graduating from Concord Academy, she studied English at Stanford University. She originally had no intentions of becoming a cartoonist, but eventually began submitting strips to The New Yorker, without success. She was then hired as a freelance copywriter for an ad agency in San Francisco. Whilst there she submitted her comics to the San Francisco Chronicle, and they were published in the opinion and book review section. Her success at the Chronicle inspired her to begin submitting her work for syndication. In 1995, Price received a call from King Features Syndicate to request more samples of her work, and by June of that year she was syndicated. Price was just 25 years old at the time, which makes her the youngest female cartoonist to achieve national syndication.

== Work ==
Price publishes her panels almost daily to her website named after her strip ("Rhymes with Orange"). The title is derived from the belief that no English word rhymes with orange.

Price's panels often feature animals such as cats and dogs in lieu of humans and don't feature any reoccurring characters.

Her strip's format is also unique in design. A typical Price comic features one long panel where the illustration and dialogue are found, and to the left is a smaller panel with the title of the strip and often a secondary punchline and smaller illustration. This setup has the reader going from right to left rather than the typical left to right found in most Western comics.

In addition to her website her work has also appeared in Parade Magazine, Funny Times, People and Glamour.

Price has released several compilations of her work in books, one of those being "Hanukkomics" in which she gathered all of her comics about Jewish culture and holidays.

Her inspirations for comics include "Dr. Seuss for the rhymes, Shel Silverstein for the clever wordplay and black-and-white illustrations, and The New Yorker cartoonists Roz Chast, Sam Gross and George Booth." But her main influence comes from greeting card artist Sandra Boynton. In the eighth grade, Price learned that Boynton, whom she had assumed was a male, was in fact a female. This opened up the idea to Price that women could do "funny drawings" too.

== Personal life ==
After graduating college, Price moved to San Francisco for several years before moving to western Massachusetts in 1987, living first in South Deerfield and then in Northampton.

Price is an openly gay, Jewish woman who lives in Hadley, Massachusetts with her dog. She plays ice hockey.
