= Bill Holbrook =

American cartoonist (born 1958)

- Holbrook at Dragon Con in 2026
- Born: 1958 (age 67–68); Los Angeles
- Occupations: Cartoonist and artist

Bill Holbrook (born 1958) is an American cartoonist and webcomic writer and artist, best known for his syndicated comic strip On the Fastrack.

Born in Los Angeles, Holbrook grew up in Huntsville, Alabama, and began drawing at an early age. While majoring in illustration and visual design at Auburn University, Holbrook served as art director of the student newspaper, doing editorial cartoons and a weekly comic strip. At the same time, his work was being published in the Huntsville Times and the Monroe Journal. After graduation in 1980, he joined the Atlanta Constitution as an editorial staff artist.

During a 1982 visit to relatives on the West Coast, Holbrook met Peanuts creator, Charles Schulz. Following his advice and encouragement, Holbrook created a strip in the fall of that year about a college graduate working in a rundown diner. It did not stir syndicate interest, but what he learned on the strip helped him when he created On the Fastrack.

Eleven days before On the Fastrack made its syndicated debut (March 19, 1984), Holbrook met Teri Peitso on a blind date. They were married on Pearl Harbor Day, 1985. They have two daughters, Chandler and Haviland. Peitso-Holbrook's novels have been nominated for both Edgar Awards and Agatha Awards. She is currently an assistant professor in literacy education at Georgia State University. The family lives in the Atlanta area.

On October 3, 1988, Holbrook began his second strip, Safe Havens, and his third strip, Kevin and Kell, was launched in September 1995.

== Comic strips ==
Every week Holbrook writes the story line for the next three weeks for one of his strips and draws the next three weeks' worth of strips for another. In 2010, characters from On the Fastrack and Safe Havens began appearing in both strips.

- On the Fastrack - About the misadventures at Fastrack, Inc., On the Fastrack has been distributed by King Features Syndicate since 1984. It now appears in 75 newspapers nationwide.
- Safe Havens - Initially about a day care center, this strip evolved into the adventures of Samantha Argus and her friends and is now syndicated nationally to over 50 newspapers.
- Kevin and Kell - Originally an online-only strip but was also published in the Atlanta Journal-Constitution for some years, Kevin and Kell centers on the mixed marriage between a rabbit, Kevin, and a grey wolf, Kell Dewclaw. The plot revolves around species-related humor, satire, and interpersonal conflict.
- Duel In The Somme - Holbrook illustrated a story by Ben Bova and Rob Balder in this strip about a romantic rivalry between a computer-simulation designer and his boss.
