= Kevin and Kell =

Furry comedy webcomic strip

- Author: Bill Holbrook
- Website: www.kevinandkell.com
- Current status/schedule: Updating daily
- Launch date: September 3, 1995
- Publisher(s): The Atlanta Journal-Constitution; Plan 9 Publishing; Pencil Rough Productions
- Genre: Furry/Comedy

Kevin and Kell is a furry-themed webcomic strip by syndicated cartoonist Bill Holbrook. The strip began on September 3, 1995, and is one of the oldest continuously running webcomics. The comic's website states it is "The World's Longest Running Daily Webcomic".

The strip centers on the mixed marriage between Kevin Dewclaw, a rabbit, and Kell Dewclaw, a grey wolf. In their society, their major difference is their diet: Kevin is a herbivore and Kell is a carnivore. Their family includes three children: Lindesfarne, a hedgehog adopted from Kevin's first marriage; Rudy, a wolf/fox hybrid from Kell's first marriage; and their only biological child Coney, an omnivorous rabbit. The comic's plot revolves around species-related humor, satire, and interpersonal conflict.

Kevin and Kell reports receiving over three million page views each month. It was also published in The Atlanta Journal-Constitution for ten years. Holbrook has won honors from the Web Cartoonists' Choice Awards and the Ursa Major Awards for the strip.

== Setting ==
Kevin and Kell takes place in a town called Domain, populated entirely by animals. According to the comic, its world was created by an organization of birds, commonly referred to by fans of the comic as the "Great Bird Conspiracy" (GBC). Birds were the next species after humans to reach sapience. After humans left the planet, the birds traveled back in time to create a world without humans, and gave intelligence to fauna. However, their plan to remove the predator-prey relationship failed and as a result, the world created is similar to that of twenty-first century Earth, but with a greater likelihood of a violent death.

The society in Kevin and Kell - rather than identifying people by race or social class - has class distinctions based on diet such as "carnivores", "herbivores", "insectivores" and "omnivores." There is also a "Wild" where civilized animals can leave civilization and act like normal animals, walking on all fours and not wearing clothing. Predation is central to strips and jokes are made about it being commonplace.

Humans exist in an alternate Domain, and are referred to as creatures with no natural defenses. Most believe that they are fictional creatures, but a few, including the Dewclaws, know that they exist. This was developed further in 2003 by the introduction of the character Danielle, a human who enters the animal world via the Bermuda Triangle and transforms into a rabbit. However, she later has a son, Francis, who is born human.

The series features jokes on a variety of topics. Many draw satirical parallels between its world and ours, making fun and sometimes social commentary on politics, sports, society, class-snobbery, school, technology, pop culture and corporate culture. For example, in January 2008 the Predator's Union was described as going on strike, in a parody of the 2007–08 Writers Guild of America strike.

== Main characters ==
The strip's main characters are the Dewclaws, a blended family as a result of an interspecies marriage. The comic's primary characters are Kevin Dewclaw, a rabbit, and his wife Kell Dewclaw, a wolf. They met in a web forum for carnivores, where Kevin was "lurking". They began to fall in love, but it was not until they met each other in person that Kell discovered Kevin was a rabbit. The relationship they developed online leads them to continue dating and eventually marry, despite knowing that they would be outcasts from the rest of society.

Originally, Kevin worked as a system operator on a herbivore web forum, although he later became the co-owner of his own internet service provider, Hare-Link. Kell worked for Herd-Thinners, a company that hunts down prey. Her job is to hunt down other animals. Originally she hunted down her own prey – any prey not eaten by her is later sold in grocery stores as "processed meat" – but she later became an executive and then CEO of the company, taking over from her old boss R.L., a ruthless wolf whose face is never seen apart from his drooling muzzle. Kell was eventually pushed out of her executive position in a bloodless coup by R.L., and started running her own start-up company "Dewclaw's Fine Meat Products" that exclusively doesn't hunt rabbits.

The couple has three children. The eldest is Lindesfarne Dewclaw, an English hedgehog daughter Kevin adopted during his first marriage. The second eldest child is Rudy, Kell's son from her first marriage to a fox. Rudy, a talented artist, once challenged Kevin for the position of alpha male, unable to accept a rabbit as head of the household and as his stepfather. He has since matured and has come to terms with the marriage. The youngest child is Coney, an omnivorous rabbit and their only child by birth. She is a capable apex hunter, although Kevin's mother, Dorothy, initially tried to convert her into an herbivore but gradually accepted her mixed diet. Coney also has an artistic streak like her half-brother. Now in her teens, she's currently performing her annual duties in being the bodyguard to her cousin Wendell Luckyfoot, the Easter Bunny in their county; along with her tigress best friend, Lin Lee, who has a major crush on him.

Other regular characters include: Fenton Fuscus, a bat who is married to Lindesfarne and with her have a hedgehog-bat hybrid daughter, Turvy; Fiona Fennec, a half-red, half-Fennec fox vixen who being Rudy's longtime girlfriend since their early teens, has recently married him; George Fennec, Fiona's father who is married to Danielle, a sister of Kevin, and have a human son, Francis (the first of its kind in this world) since Danielle herself was human once; and Ralph Dewclaw, Kell's brother who was originally hostile to Kevin, but now accepts the rabbit as family after several unsuccessful hunting attempts. He now works for Kevin as part of Hare-Link and is married to George's former wife Martha. Another character is Daisy, a daisy plant made intelligent by the GBC. It lives with the Dewclaws as a pet, having the same intelligence as a dog or cat in our world.

== History ==
Kevin and Kell was one of the first comic strips to be syndicated online, although older webcomics exist. For example, Argon Zark! was created in June 1995, three months before Kevin and Kell. However, Holbrook states that webcomics with earlier start dates have "(to the best of my knowledge) either ceased or has had significant multi-year hiatuses."

The strip started in black and white, changing to color on June 23, 2000. It is currently colored by husband and wife team Terrence and Isabel Marks. The strip has been considered for an animated television series, the latest attempt being filmed in spring 2011. Kevin and Kell appeared daily in The Atlanta Journal-Constitution from 2004 to 2014, after winning a contest where several new comics (syndicated and/or online) were considered and voted on by readers. During its time with the AJC, Holbrook stated that this constituted the "bulk of his readership", citing the paper's circulation. In 2009, Kevin and Kell survived a cull of several comic strips from the paper, and in an online poll was voted as the favorite of the paper's readers.

Holbrook writes two other strips; On the Fastrack and Safe Havens. He uses a "three-week schedule", saying in several interviews, "During this week, for instance, I'll be writing three week's worth of Fastrack material, and drawing the 21 gags I wrote for Kevin & Kell last week. Next week I'll write for Safe Havens while drawing the Fastrack batch. And on it goes… On a typical day I'll begin by writing four gags by 2:00, then I'll begin drawing, usually doing about four strips. At night, after everyone goes to bed, I'll write two gags."

In 1998, Holbrook was named "Cartoonist of the Year" at Pogofest, in part for his work on Kevin and Kell. In 2001, the strip won the award for "Best Anthropomorphic Comic" at the Web Cartoonists' Choice Awards, and was nominated for the same award in 2002. In 2003, Kevin and Kell won the award for "Best Anthropomorphic Comic Strip" at the Ursa Major Awards.

== Reception ==
Since its creation, Kevin and Kell been mainly been given positive reviews, although there has also been some criticism. Zompist.com comic reviewer "Bob" praised the way the comic is written and illustrated, and its dealings with difficult issues such as divorce and death. However, he criticized its suburban nature, saying: "All the family crises are defused within a week or two. No one has any aspirations besides a computer-related job and a quiet heterosexual romance. There seem to be no cities, no foreign nations, no art, no teenage sex." Another review from Disjointed Ramblings commented on the use of satire in the comic, writing that "while the satire is usually gentle, there's plenty of it."

Brandon Sanderson's review in The Official Time Waster's Guide cites the comic's world design, longevity and a discomforting setting where intelligent animals are killed as strengths. However, Sanderson also complained that Holbrook does not enforce this aspect in the main characters, saying, "While Kell, Rudy, and others make kills every day, none of the main character herbivores ever really have to worry about being stalked and killed. When they are threatened (such as when Lindesfarne is stalked by some cougars near the beginning of the comic's run), the enemy predators are presented as dark, evil things to be defeated.…This sense of careless, off-handed killing gives the comic a lot of its humor—however, to maintain that air of humor, Bill never allows the society to work its everyday worst on any of the main characters."

During a review in webcomic podcast Digital Strips, commentator Daku described Kevin and Kell as "one of the few anthropomorphic strips that I actually like," saying that "this is as if animals had a society." Zampzon praises the quality of the artwork, but complains that the strip relies on too many animal jokes. Writer T. Campbell wrote that Holbrook brought "an air of legitimacy and professionalism that many web cartoonists lacked then and still lack now."

Kevin and Kell and Holbrook are both popular within the furry fandom. Holbrook was first contacted by the fandom in late 1995, soon after the strip was published. He attended his first furry convention, ConFurence, in January 1997. Holbrook holds an annual "Kevin and Kell patron social" at Anthrocon for people who sponsor the strip. Holbrook also works occasionally with other cartoonists, both furry and non-furry, and characters from his strip make cameos in other strips. These have included Ozy and Millie, General Protection Fault, PartiallyClips, and Schlock Mercenary.

== Products ==
The front cover of the first Kevin and Kell book, "Quest for Content".

There are 27 books containing collections of Kevin and Kell strips, including bonus strips. They are currently published by Holbrook's own publishing imprint, Pencil Rough Productions, with older books originally published by Plan 9 Publishing and briefly with Moonbase Press.

#	Name	ISBN
1	Quest for Content	ISBN 0-9660676-0-6
2	Seen Anything Unusual?	ISBN 0-9660676-1-4
3	Accepting Domestication	ISBN 0-9660676-6-5
4	Run Free!	ISBN 0-9660676-9-X
5	For the Birds	ISBN 1-929462-18-2
6	Election Night Fever	ISBN 1-929462-29-8
7	Booth Bunnies	ISBN 1-929462-26-3
8	Carrots & Sticks (Hardcover & Soft cover)	ISBN 1-929462-30-1
9	Straight Outta Computers (Hardcover & Soft cover)	ISBN 1-929462-87-5
10	Oh, the Humanity	ISBN 1-929462-65-4
11	Iron Rabbit	ISBN 1-929462-07-7
12	Yo Momma	ISBN 1-929462-79-4
13	Pregnant Paws	ISBN 978-0-9748915-2-1
14	Rules of Engagement	ISBN 978-1-9395440-4-9
15	On Strike!	ISBN 978-1-9395440-5-6
16	Honeymoon 2.0	ISBN 978-1-9395440-6-3
17	Alpha Female	ISBN 978-1-9395440-7-0
18	Predator Camp	ISBN 978-1-9395441-0-0
19	Mouscar	ISBN 978-1-9395441-5-5
20	Sheep Dip	ISBN 978-1-9395442-2-3
21	Paper Trained	ISBN 978-1-9395443-2-2
22	Little Shop of Carnivores	ISBN 978-1-9395443-5-3
23	Turvy	ISBN 978-1-9395443-8-4
24	Mouse Mom	ISBN 978-1-9395444-1-4
25	Revenge Served Wild	ISBN 978-1-9395444-2-1
26	Masked Romance	ISBN 978-1-9395444-7-6
27	The Usual Growth Spurt	ISBN 978-1-9395445-0-6
28	Escape From Herd Thinners	ISBN 978-1-9395445-3-7
29	Shell Game	ISBN 978-1-9395445-6-8
Treasury 1	Historic Kevin & Kell	ISBN 978-0-9748915-7-6
Treasury 2	The Great Bird Conspiracy	ISBN 978-1-9395440-9-4

A role-playing game based on Kevin and Kell was released in July 2005 by Comstar Games. Hare Link, the Internet Service Provider run by Kevin, was a real-life ISP for some time.

In November 2010, a Kevin and Kell iPhone/iPod/iPad app was released to the iTunes App Store. The app is a joint product between Bill Holbrook and the developers of the app, WareTo. The app allows users to read the entire Kevin & Kell library of cartoons, and contains additional features and content including video, cast descriptions, and hidden surprise "Easter eggs."

According to Write 2 Now's December 2010 newsletter, Holbrook and Phil Rogers were working to get the strip made into an animated cartoon series, with a pitch to cable executives, but a deal was never made.
