= Bob Weber (cartoonist) =

American cartoonist (1934–2020)

- Born: June 26, 1934; South Baltimore, Maryland
- Died: October 17, 2020 (aged 86)
- Education: School of Visual Arts
- Occupation: Cartoonist
- Known for: Moose and Molly
- Children: Bob Weber, Jr.

Bob Weber, Sr. (June 26, 1934 – October 17, 2020), was an American cartoonist, best known for his Moose and Molly comic strip, distributed by King Features Syndicate.

== Early life ==
Weber was born and raised in South Baltimore, Maryland.

He attended the School of Visual Arts in New York City in 1953.

== Career ==
Weber's career as a cartoonist and illustrator moved into high gear in 1959, when he contributed to The Saturday Evening Post and the syndicated Laff-a-Day panels.

Relocating to Connecticut, he became cartoonist Dick Cavalli's assistant on Winthrop. In 1965, he launched his own strip, which began September 20, 1965, as Moose, retitled Moose Miller six years later. It was renamed Moose and Molly (aka Moose & Molly) in 1998. After peaking with 200 newspapers, it eventually dropped to 75 papers.

Weber lived in Westport, Connecticut, which he referred to as "Westpork".

Weber's son, cartoonist Bob Weber, Jr., reaches a readership of 30 million with his Slylock Fox & Comics for Kids puzzle feature. He also co-created the short-lived Oh, Brother! strip.
