= Gearhead =

Gearhead(s) may refer to:

- Slang for an automobile enthusiast, usually with mechanical abilities
- Slang for a technology enthusiast, usually one who is tech savvy.
- Geared head, a type of photography tripod head used in cinematography to ensure very smooth pans and tilts
- Gearhead (DC Comics), a comic book supervillain
- Gearhead, a Rick and Morty character
- Gearhead Records, a record label
- Gearhead Garage, a 1999 video game
- Gearhead Gertie, a syndicated comic strip
- Gearheads (video game), a 1996 video game
- Transmission (mechanics), a mechanical gearing device that reduces or increases gearing that is connected to a motor
