= Plan Nine Publishing =

- Status: Defunct
- Founded: 1996
- Founder: David Allen
- Country of origin: United States
- Publication types: Books
- Fiction genres: Comics
- Official website: www.plan9publishing.com

Plan Nine Publishing was a small press book publisher known for publishing webcomics in printed form. The first series published, and perhaps its most famous, was Kevin and Kell.

== History ==
Plan Nine Publishing was named after the Ed Wood film Plan 9 from Outer Space. The publisher was owned by David Allen, who worked publishing alongside his day job as a systems engineer at Financial Computing in Winston-Salem. Plan nine was started in 1996, and in January 2000 Allen left his day job to concentrate full-time on the publishing business.

98% of Plan Nine's products were sold direct to customers through their website. With low print runs (typically less than 2000), the company were able to run with a profit with runs as low as 300. The low running costs meant that the company was able to have a 70% gross profit margin, and was able to give its artists a 20% royalty, more than 4 times the industrial average.

In April 2008, the Plan Nine main page was replaced by a message stating: Plan Nine has gone on hiatus for re-tooling and transition to new owners. Please check back with us Sept 1st, 2008. Thanks for your support! That page remained until the site finally went offline in 2010.

== Publications ==
In addition to Kevin and Kell, Plan Nine published a number of other notable webcomics, including:

- Bastard Operator From Hell
- Buckles
- Doctor Fun
- Monty
- On the Fastrack
- Ozy and Millie
- Safe Havens
- Sluggy Freelance
- The Suburban Jungle
- User Friendly

Plan Nine also published Black Box Voting by Bev Harris, a nonfiction book discussing the issues involved in computer-based balloting. In 2004, the company published I Lived with My Parents and Other Tales of Terror, a collection of nonfiction and humor essays by Mary Jo Pehl.
