= Franklin Fibbs =

American comic strip

Wes Hargis and Hollis Brown's Franklin Fibbs (April 2, 2006)

Franklin Fibbs is an American comic strip written by Hollis Brown and illustrated by Wes Hargis. Distributed by King Features Syndicate, it began September 6, 2004, and ran for two years.

== Characters and story ==
The cartoon revolves around Franklin Fibbs, Franklin's bemused and loyal wife Paloma, whose main job around the store is to keep her husband and his imagination in check, and Josh, a neighborhood boy who works at Fibbs' General Store. Josh's curiosity and wide-eyed enthusiasm make him the perfect audience for Franklin's absurd tales. When Franklin's stories are particularly outlandish or borderline pathological, Paloma will often throw Josh a raised eyebrow or toss Franklin a choice retort in her native Spanish.

== Little Fibbs ==
On May 7, 2006, Brown and Hargis changed the name of the strip to Little Fibbs and changed the premise, focusing on the younger Fibbs as a precocious boy. The transition from the old format to the new began with the elder Franklin using a time machine to visit his younger self. After a series of strips involving both characters, readers learned that the elder Franklin was a figment of the younger boy's imagination, and Franklin's elder self disappeared. King Features marketing manager Rose McAllister stated that the change was made to avoid the perception that the strip was only designed for older readers. Paloma is still a character as a young girl, but the strip also featured Franklin's cat Roscoe and Clyde, a gila monster.

The new change did not increase the newspaper sales, and after few months, it ended. According to McAllister, the Fibbs strip maintained about 25–35 newspapers during its two-year run.^{[1]}

The last strips appeared during the first week of October 2006 when the elder Franklin returned in his time machine. Big and little Fibbs then considered whom to blame for the strip's cancellation—everyone but the writer, Hollis Brown. The last daily appeared on Saturday, October 8, and the last Sunday was published on October 9.
