= Buckles (comics) =

American comic strip by David Gilbert

- Author: David Gilbert
- Current status/schedule: Ended
- Launch date: March 25, 1996
- End date: March 21, 2021
- Syndicate(s): King Features Syndicate
- Publisher: Plan 9 Publishing (2002-2005)
- Genre(s): Humor, satire

Buckles is a comic strip by David Gilbert about the misadventures of an anthropomorphic naïve dog. Buckles debuted on March 25, 1996, and ended on March 21, 2021.

According to King Features Syndicate: "More of an only child with canine instincts than he is the family pet. Buckles can display all the charm...of a small child discovering how to find his way through life."

GoComics began a repeat run of the strip effective May 10, 2021.

== Characters ==
=== Buckles ===
Buckles is a guileless and innocent dog, and is the strip's protagonist. He was born on March 25, 1996 (The same day the first strip was published). Most of the storylines of the Buckles comic series involve moral issues within Buckles himself. Of course since he is a puppy, issues are more to the point of whether or not to get in the garbage, roll in the mud, or chew up a valuable piece of clothing. Buckles also fears cats. One of Buckles' favorite things to chew up seems to be the remote control to the TV, often ending in a strict lecture from Paul (his owner). The other is to attack and kill Paul's vacuum cleaners. And of course most of his misadventures end either with praise and a treat or a quick "No! Bad Dog!"/"Buckles, You Bad Dog!"

=== Paul and Jill Haggerson ===
Buckles' owners who are strict and kind. Paul and Jill love Buckles. When he does something bad, they often scold him and put him in the garage.

Paul, or Jill, often says/yells "BUCKLES, YOU BAD DOG!!!!" (which is their catchphrase) when annoyed with Buckles.

In May 2006, it was revealed Paul previously had a dog named Shadow before he and Jill got married.

=== Christina ===
Jill's niece who puts dresses on Buckles and makes him attend her tea parties.

=== Flea ===
An unseen but heard presence who lives behind Buckles' right ear.

=== Arden ===
A bird whom Buckles often asks for advice. He likes worms, because they're for lunch.

Arden occasionally breaks the fourth wall, especially on June 3, 2007.

=== Lester ===
A dog who, because of hip dysplasia, has a sort of wheelchair apparatus providing mobility instead of his hind legs.

=== Rusty ===
A streetwise stray whose freedom Buckles envies.

=== Scrappy ===
An annoying squirrel who lives in the backyard. He hates Buckles and Arden, frequently insulting them and calling them rude names like "slobber face" (Buckles) and "beak brain" (Arden).

There are several stories involving Scrappy in the series. One example is him getting in a fight with a black squirrel. Another occasional story is where Scrappy breaks into Paul and Jill's attic and realizes he is lost.

=== Irene ===
The love interest of Buckles' life that is a fire hydrant.

=== Paperboy ===
A younger newspaper deliverer who often throws rolled-up newspapers at Buckles.

=== Other characters ===
- Charlie: A minor character in the comic series. He is a goose and a rival of Buckles. Charlie refers to him as "mad dog", and occasionally "Mary Poppins". In some stories, Charlie and the other geese break into Paul's house and throw a "party" by destroying the house, but after Paul and Jill get home, they fly off. Paul and Jill are then mad at Buckles because they think he threw a party (Paul doesn't even allow parties at his house; he had one as a teenager). Another occasional story is where Charlie and the other geese ruin Paul's Corvette and Buckles scares them off by barking at them.
- Sophie and Iris: Female American Eskimo Dog and bloodhound respectively and two of Buckles' friends who argue over trying to talk to him.
- The black squirrel, Scrappy's nemesis.
- Paul's parents and brother from the summer vacation strips.
- Jay: A blue bird who is Arden's assistant.

== Recurring jokes ==
There is meta-humor in this strip; for example, the characters talk with their mouths closed. Their dialogue has many exclamation points when they talk quietly or nicely like the dialogue in Peanuts. Also, in some strips, there are repeated drawings and lines (i.e. in the May 21, 2008 strip, Buckles steps back from a harmless garter snake, horrified. He then hides behind Paul, who rolls his eyes and says, "For crying out loud, Buckles! It's just a harmless garter snake!" After that, like Buckles, Paul steps back from the harmless garter snake, horrified. Then he hides behind Jill, who is gardening but rolls her eyes, saying, "For crying out loud, Paul!..." like Paul did with Buckles).

== Books ==
There are three different comic collections published by Plan 9 Publishing:

- Buckles Unleashed (2002)
- There's a Street Dog in All of Us! (2003)
- A Good Vacuum is a Dead Vacuum! (2005)

Currently, the books are out of stock. David Gilbert left the publisher and will seek into another printing option for the current and future collections.
