= Alex Hallatt =

British cartoonist (born c.1970/71)

- Born: c. 1970 or 1971 (age 55–56)
- Known for: cartoons; drawing

Alex Hallatt (born c. 1970 or 1971) is a British cartoonist.

== Early life ==
Hallatt grew up in Dorset, England. She has a degree in biochemistry from the University of Kent at Canterbury.

== Career ==
One of her first comic strips was for her university newspaper. The comic was about a student who was half man and half mosquito who was fly-swatted at the end. Once she obtained her degree, worked as a waitress at a restaurant in New Jersey while developing her comic Polar Circle, later named Arctic Circle. Hallatt also went on to work in clinical research for seven years before becoming a full-time cartoonist in 1999 where she landed a job working for Brighton's daily newspaper. In 2003, she moved to Lyttelton, New Zealand, before moving to Australia in 2008. In 2012, she returned to England. The American syndicate King Features distributes her comic Arctic Circle. Her webcomic, Human Cull, appears on GoComics.com.

Hallatt writes and illustrates books for children. Her first chapter book, FAB (Friends Against Bullying) Club, was published in 2016.
