= Todd the Dinosaur =

American comic strip

Todd the Dinosaur written and drawn by Patrick Roberts, is an American gag-a-day comic strip about a 7-year-old Tyrannosaurus attending elementary school. Being only second graders, his classmates accept Todd as they would anyone else. The strip first appeared in 2001 in The Oklahoman and is published by King Features Syndicate. It has also appeared in Record-Journal, Herald News and San Francisco Chronicle. It participated in the second Earth Day comic event of King Features. During one day, 37 of their creators used their comics to advance an environmental theme.

== Characters ==
Todd: Todd is a 7-year-old, 12-foot-tall (3.7 m) Tyrannosaurus who lives with his friend Trent. He is known to have a "ravenous appetite" and will eat almost anything.

Trent: Trent Footbridge is a 27-year-old, easy-going guy who acts as Todd's "adopted" father, as he treats Todd more like a kid than a pet. He works at an insurance company.

Susie: Susie is Trent's girlfriend. She is 25 years old. She has been dating Trent for three years. She is patient and nurturing to Todd.

== Reception ==
In a 2008 survey from The Oklahoman readers, Todd the Dinosaur finished 14th among the 33 comics of the journal. It is one of the comics which remains in the daily features section and in the Sunday Comics section.
