= Rina Piccolo =

Canadian cartoonist

Rina Piccolo is a Canadian cartoonist, best known for her comic strip Tina's Groove, distributed by King Features Syndicate since 2002. She has been a professional cartoonist for more than two decades and recently gained recognition as an author of short stories. Since 2016, she has assisted Hillary Price on the comic strip Rhymes with Orange (also distributed by King Features Syndicate).

== Early life ==
Born and raised in Toronto, Piccolo began her career in 1989 when her first cartoon submission was accepted by Now magazine. According to Piccolo, her "early acceptance gave me a false sense of how hard the next years were going to be. It was followed by trillions of rejections."

== Comic strips ==
The magazine Comic Relief published her cartoons during the early 1990s. From 2000 to October 2016, she has held the position as the "Wednesday chick" on King Features' daily Six Chix strip. In 2002, Piccolo launched Tina's Groove, about Tina, a single, attractive and self-aware waitress who works at Pepper's Restaurant. Working six days a week, she draws the comics on alternate days. Published in newspapers throughout the United States and Canada, Tina's Groove is also available through King Features' DailyINK email service. She talked about gagwriting in a 2003 online chat: "I discover Six Chix gags when I'm fishing for Tina's Groove gags ... I do my writing for both strips at the same time, usually two to three days a week."

In May 2010, Piccolo started an online comic strip, Velia, Dear. Published on Mondays, Wednesdays and Fridays, Velia, Dear is about a young Toronto woman who lives with her conservatively Catholic mother and is dating a Jewish boyfriend. Since February 2012, the strip appears to be in hiatus.

Piccolo has stepped in as a guest cartoonist on Hilary Price's Rhymes with Orange twice, as she discussed in 2010 with Michael Cavna of Comic Riffs:

I don't know if I'm a better gag writer than I was eight years ago, but I've certainly written and drawn more gags since then, so I can say I've practiced my socks off, and know this stuff better than I ever have. And yes, I also know Hilary's slant on things, her voice as a gag writer, from reading her stuff all these years. She's grown as a cartoonist, too! So when I say that my first RWO stint wasn't "up to snuff", it's simply my neurotic self talking. You might say I had stagefright back then, and maybe now that I seem to be more aware of my work—and certainly more practiced—the stagefright is no longer an issue. I've gained some degree of confidence.

== Cartoon collections ==
She has also created drawings for books, cartoon anthologies, greeting cards and magazines, including Parade and The New Yorker. In 2006, Andrews McMeel published Tina's Groove: A Cartoon Collection. Her other cartoon collections are Stand Back, I Think I'm Gonna Laugh (Laugh Lines, 1994), Kicking the Habit: Cartoons about the Catholic Church (Laugh Lines, 1996) and Rina's Big Book of Sex Cartoons (Laugh Lines, 1997).

She lives in Queens, New York City, with her husband, Brendan Burford, and their canary, Olive.

== Awards ==
Her story, "The Dinner Plan", was a finalist in Narrative magazine's Spring 2011 short story contest. The Fall 2011 issue of Narrative published her story, "Takeout".
