= Slylock Fox & Comics for Kids =

American comic strip by Bob Weber Jr.

Slylock Fox
- Author: Bob Weber Jr.
- Website: https://www.slylockfox.com
- Current status/schedule: Running
- Launch date: March 29, 1987; 39 years ago
- Syndicate(s): King Features Syndicate
- Genre(s): Puzzles and children's activities

Slylock Fox is a daily comic strip created by Bob Weber Jr. and published by King Features Syndicate. Bob Weber Jr. is the son of Bob Weber Sr., creator of the comic strip Moose & Molly. The target audience is young children. According to the official website, Slylock Fox appears in nearly 400 newspapers with a combined readership of over 30 million.

== Overview ==
Slylock Fox regularly features a logic puzzle presented in a single panel. Slylock, an anthropomorphic fox detective, is constantly matching wits against a variety of criminals, including Count Weirdly, Shady Shrew and Slick Smitty. The strip does not normally use dialogue; instead, text accompanying the illustration informs the reader of a problem Slylock must solve. These often include escaping from a dungeon, locating stolen goods, or determining who committed a crime through visual clues or logical inconsistencies. The puzzle solution is printed upside down.

Slylock is assisted by sidekick Max Mouse. Max wears pink shorts and a matching bowler hat. He functions as Slylock's foil, being distracted at the crime scene or coming to a false conclusion, only to be corrected by Slylock.

A varied cast of witnesses, victims, policemen and criminals fill in the rest of Slylock's world. These characters' names usually contain either some form of alliteration, a type of animal, a profession, or a personality trait. This allows Weber to quickly establish a scene and set up a mystery using very little space. Some notable examples include Deputy Duck, Roxy Rabbit, and Shady Shrew. Most of these characters are seen once and/or never again.

Slylock's name is likely an homage to the fictional detective Sherlock Holmes. Like Sherlock, Slylock is traditionally depicted with a magnifying glass and a blue deerstalker hat; also, he wears a blue suit and cape.

The Slylock Fox logic puzzles appear only in Sunday and Monday strips. The Tuesday to Saturday strips consist of spot the difference puzzles, trivia challenges, how-to-draw tutorials, and other activities. The Sunday edition features both Slylock and the activities.

== Characters ==
In addition to a large cast of one-time characters, the strip has a recurring cast of heroes and villains.

=== Protagonists ===
- Slylock Fox, a fox detective who relies on logic and observation. He normally appears quite stoic.
- Max Mouse, Slylock's sidekick. He occasionally finds clues that Slylock misses, but is usually less focused.
- Chief Mutt and Deputy Duck, the local police, a bulldog and duck.
- Tiffany Fox and Melody Mouse, two friendly bystanders and occasional victims. They sometimes act as romantic interests for Slylock and Max.
- Sir Hound
- Granny Squirrel
- Rachel Rabbit
- Princess Pussycat

=== Antagonists ===
- Slick Smitty, one of the few humans, a perpetually smug con-artist and recurring villain.
- Cassandra Cat, a jewel thief who gets by on her charm and beauty. Slylock seems to be the only one who is not fazed. Cassandra plays the role of a femme fatale, and has influences in characters such as Irene Adler and Catwoman.
- Count Weirdly, an eccentric scientist who lives in a castle full of creepy creatures and monsters. His crimes range from dangerously insane to simple cons. Weirdly's theming takes influence from elements of various vintage horror and science-fiction films, particularly the gothic horror subgenre.
- Shady Shrew, a lower class citizen in a run-down house who constantly steals and lies.
- Reeky Rat, a conniving, mullet-headed rat that lives in a trailer down by the river.
- Harry Ape, a big gorilla that has a habit of robbing banks. His short, white-haired mama ape often offers false alibis for her felonious offspring.
- Koppy Kat, a painting forger known for always leaving some sort of error in the paintings.
- Big Brad Wolf, a lowlife single father to his son, Little Brad Wolf.

== Media ==
The now-defunct Slylock Fox website featured many additional Slylock mysteries that have never been printed, in addition to other activities. The site was voted an "Educational Best Bet" by USA Today and received an award for "Best of the Net" from About.com in April 1999. The site currently redirects to the official page for Weber's other comic strip, Oh, Brother!.

An iPhone game titled Slylock Fox Spot the Differences was made available for download on the App Store in 2011. The game allowed users to play fifty of Bob Weber Jr.'s favorite spot the differences puzzles in a digital format. Due to the restrictions on compatibility with later versions of iOS, the game was delisted from the marketplace in 2018.

=== Collections ===
Reprints of the different activities featured in the strip are distributed through the Slylock Fox official store.

- Find the Six Differences #1
- Find the Six Differences #2
- Find the Six Differences #3
- Bob Weber Jr.'s How To Draw Cartoons
- Bob Weber Jr.'s Slylock Fox Mystery Puzzles
- Bob Weber Jr.'s True or False
- Bob Weber Jr.'s Trivia
- Bob Weber Jr.'s Other Puzzles
- The Bob Weber Jr.'s Tagged Puzzles
- Find the Six Difference #4
- Go Fun Slylock Fox Mystery Puzzles and Go Fun Spot Six Differences: Compilation volumes by Andrews McMeel Publishing

== Film adaptation ==
In September 2022, it was reported that King Features will be adapting Slylock Fox into an animated feature film. Evan Daugherty will write and produce and CJ Kettler will executive produce.

== Legacy ==
=== Your Drawing ===
Art of JoJo's Bizarre Adventure character Diego Brando, drawn by creator Hirohiko Araki, submitted to the Your Drawing feature.

A notable feature of the Sunday editions of the strip is Your Drawing, a child-submitted artwork space which in recent years has been utilized by older readers of the strip to submit artwork of their own or of fictional characters that many might recognize. During the COVID-19 pandemic, as well as some years prior, the strip saw an influx of submissions from fans of manga series JoJo's Bizarre Adventure, containing artwork from both fans and series creator Hirohiko Araki, the latter's without expressed permission from franchise copyright holders.

Weber Jr., via the strip's social media accounts, frequently interacts with fans who have submitted artwork to Your Drawing and who create fan art of the comic. Through his posts, readers discovered he was aware of the rise in JoJo submissions. In a Reddit post on r/comics, a user tagged JoJo fan subreddit r/UnexpectedJoJo in response to a Your Drawing submission of character Giorno Giovanna from the Golden Wind arc of the series. In response, Weber Jr. replied, through the official Slylock Fox repost account, "Good eye! Have an upvote."

=== Appearances in other strips ===
Slylock Fox and Cassandra Cat guest starred in a week of My Cage comic strips in October 2007.

Stephan Pastis parodied the format of Slylock Fox in his comic strip Pearls Before Swine on January 13, 2008; Weber reciprocated by having Rat and Pig, the two main characters from Pearls, appear in Slylock on February 3 of that year. Pastis repeated with another parody on April 24, 2016.
