= My Cage =

American comic strip by Melissa DaJesus and Ed Power

- Author(s): Melissa DeJesus and Ed Power
- Current status/schedule: Canceled (print) Revived (web)
- Launch date: May 5, 2007
- End date: October 31, 2010
- Syndicate(s): King Features Syndicate (2007–2010); GoComics.com (reruns, 2011–2020); Patreon (new strips and reruns, 2015–Present)
- Genre(s): Humor

My Cage is an American daily comic strip by Melissa DeJesus and Ed Power and was distributed by King Features Syndicate. The strip debuted on May 6, 2007, while the final strip ran on October 31, 2010. My Cage was the first "manga-inspired" comic to be syndicated by King Features. The strip was then in reruns on Universal Uclick's gocomics.com from November 5, 2011 until November 5, 2020.

As of June 1, 2015, new strips and reruns can be found on Patreon.

The comic is set in a post-human world of anthropomorphic animals, in which the protagonist attempts to juggle a soul-sucking corporate career with freelance writing.

== Characters ==
- Norman T. Platypus, the strip's protagonist. Norm is a twentysomething aspiring freelance writer who works as a supervisor for the fictitious corporation McGuffin Inc. Despite his income, he believes he was happier before his job ("poorer but happier.") He regularly shaves the fur on top of his head to "make a statement about baldness," though he has yet to explain what the statement is. During the final strips, Norman briefly gave up on his dreams of being a writer after discovering that Bridget was pregnant, deciding that working at MacGuffin Inc. was worth it if it meant he could give his child a stable life just before receiving a letter from a Hollywood producer that they were interested in buying a script he had sent them earlier.
- Bridget T. Dog, Norman's girlfriend and later wife, an assistant manager for Video Cavern. Unlike Norman, she enjoys her job. Her interests include painting and Lost. She is often called a "Hippie." On May 10, 2009, Bridget and Norman broke up but later got back together. After becoming engaged, Bridget became somewhat stressed over the approaching wedding, cramming massive quantities of food as a way to cope with it. These feelings were later pacified when she ran into a former boyfriend and realized that her love for Norm overshadowed any doubts she might have about their future. Towards the strips' end, Bridget and Norman eloped to get married in Vegas and she became pregnant with his child. That baby child, named Sally Platypus, was finally born in May 2017 during the second year of the Patreon My Cage webcomic run and at the time of the 10th. anniversary of the My Cage comic strip newspaper run launch.
- Squishy, Norman's pet amoeba who is depicted with dog like behavior. She first appeared May 24, 2007, when Bridget convinced Norman to adopt her. Despite Norman's self-assured dislike for "toy amoebas," he instantly fell in love with her at first sight and seemingly adores her even more than he does Bridget (in fact the two consider each other rivals for his affection).
- Ashley T. Bengal, a coworker of Norman's, Ashley is a self-described "hyper-creative, easily bored Goth chick." At work, she takes great delight in pestering her boss, at one time stapling all his possessions to his desk (including the stapler itself). Despite this, Norman and Ashley consider each other "work spouses" and Norm is occasionally suggested to have a mild attraction to her to the point of provoking jealousy in Bridget.
- Rex T. Doberman, another coworker of Norman's, noted for his narcissistic attitude and generally vapid nature. He often talks about himself, oblivious to the presence of his coworkers and considers himself to be "naturally ripped" despite being even more overweight than Norm.
- Violet T. Chihuahua, Rex's wife and coworker. She is equally egotistical but generally more spiteful (she frequently describes those around her as inferior) and is very possessive of Rex. Her main reason for working at McGuffin was so she could keep an eye on him. Violet gave birth to her and Rex's first child Sunny on May 19, 2010. Later strips depicted her and her daughter as being the embodiment of evil (e.g., an ultrasound during Violet's pregnancy picked up a fetal heartbeat to the tune of the "Jaws" theme).
- Sunny, Rex and Violet's daughter, born May 19, 2010. Despite her seemingly innocent exterior, Sunny is even more sinister in nature than Violet; possessing a hunger for "soul-emptiness" and telekinetic abilities. Sunny was originally an infant during the last months of the My Cage newspaper run and the first year and a half of the Patreon My Cage webcomic run, but as of late 2016 Sunny has age jumped into a 2-3 year old toddler.
- Maureen T. Fox, a highly attractive programmer hired to the desk next to Norman (first appeared June 4, 2007.) Divorced and with one daughter, named Lily, Maureen is a bit of an elitist who refuses to date anyone who isn't good-looking and rich (a mid-2010 strip revealed that her obsession with money might have to do with her father abandoning her and her mother for another family after he won the lottery). She has a snarky and sarcastic sense of humor which usually reveals itself when interacting with Norm (Norm once mentioned how she considers coworkers to be "spackle friends" which she uses to fill the holes in her social life). Towards the strip's end, Maureen finally reconciled with her father but failed to take away any lesson from it.
- Jeffrey T. Shark, another coworker of Norman's, he is considered the corporation's resident imbecile. His coworkers base this claim on some of Jeff's quotes, such as "I'm sorry, what did you say? I was too busy trying to see if I can taste my own tongue." Jeff was formerly married but was divorced after he engaged in an extra-marital affair in an attempt to be more like Max. Jeffrey has a son shark named J.J. who has appeared in some episodes of the strip since 2009. Later strips have shown him occasionally bickering with Max regarding politics with Jeff taking the left and Max taking the right. Following the death of Max's boss Brian, Max pulled strings in order to get Jeff promoted to Brian's position in order to manipulate him to Max's advantage.
- Max T. Terrier, Norman's boss. Max is an archetypal snob who flaunts various luxuries around the office, due an income that is disproportionately larger than Norm's. Nonetheless, he makes a concerted effort to remain on good terms with his staff. He is seldom seen without a drink in hand and also flirts with many women despite being married. During the strip's finale, Max gloated over how Norm had returned to work for him until Norm pointed out that being an expecting father gave him a dignity that Max could never take from him, prompting Max to vanish in a flash of hellfire, swearing to return.
- Sally Platypus, Norm and Bridget's newborn baby child daughter who was born in the Patreon My Cage strips in May 2017.
- Dr. Alan T. Chipmunk, Norm's therapist, though Norman rarely feels better after meeting with him. Norm has considered Alan "even worse than Dr. Phil."
- The Creepy Janitor Guy, A rat- or possibly opossum- looking janitor seen occasionally in the MacGuffin, Inc. workplace.
- Cassandra Cat, a character from Slylock Fox making a cameo and guest appearance for a week of strips in 2007. Max hired her for her looks alone. Maureen T. Fox considers Cassandra her new "Bestest Friend," as Norman told her Cassandra was a shallow person who only succeeds because of her looks.
- Brian Puma, was introduced on June 23, 2008 as the replacement for Max's boss Lenny. At first Norman was hopeful that Brian would be a "Fresh set of eyes! Someone who won't fall for (Max's) scheming and see I do all of (Max's) work!" Norman's hopes are crushed in the next frame when Brian bluntly asks, "Who's the geek?". Tall and muscular, Brian considers himself an "outdoorsman" (which greatly irritates Norm who fancies himself an "indoorsman"). Following his introduction, Brian rarely made any speaking appearances afterward and was ultimately removed from the strip when he died of an apparent heart attack on September 9, 2010.
- Kenny the Unicorn, introduced on September 15, 2008, is a dim young man given a low-responsibility job at McGuffin. Norm deduces that he is actually a horse with a spike in his head. May also be Max's secret illegitimate son.
- The Censor Sheep, The 2 sheep, named Jeff and CeeCee, has appeared in a few My Cage strips to report about a strip that wasn't suited to taste or something like that. They appeared in a few strips during the last year of the newspaper run and once in the 2015 Patreon revival.
