= Oh, Brother! (comic strip) =

American comic strip (2010–2011)

Oh, Brother! is an American comic strip by Bob Weber Jr. and Jay Stephens, launched June 28, 2010, by King Features Syndicate. On July 29, 2011, the Oh, Brother! team announced the finale on their blog. Daily syndication ceased on August 7, 2011.

== Characters and story ==
Bud and his sister Lily live in a middle-class suburban neighborhood. King Features outlined the sibling situations and interactions:

Whether they are playing together in the family room or running amok in the schoolyard, Bud and Lily elevate the act of one-upmanship to Code Red levels. Lily is the quintessential slightly older yet far more sensible sister. She takes it upon herself to look after her uninhibited, prank-loving younger brother, Bud. While Lily wins the occasional battle with her cool-headed maturity, Bud is intent on winning the war with his brazen brand of mischief. Despite their obvious personality differences, Bud and Lily love each other deeply and have a strong sibling bond.

== Creative team ==
Bob Weber Jr. is the creator of the award-winning Slylock Fox & Comics For Kids, distributed by King Features to nearly 400 newspapers worldwide. Canadian cartoonist Jay Stephens, a regular contributor to Nickelodeon Magazine, was nominated in 2007 for a National Cartoonists Society Reuben Award for his work on three drawing instruction books. He has been nominated for several Harvey Kurtzman and Will Eisner Comic Industry Awards.

Alan Gardner reviewed the strip for The Daily Cartoonist:

The drawing style harkens back to a cartooning style of the '60s and '70s. It's void of extraneous detail (sparse backgrounds, no wrinkles/folds in clothing) which adds to the simplistic writing of the comic. There are no belabored setups to get to the punchline... Another mark of its simplicity is the feature tries to be timeless. There are no iPods, iPads, iMacs or any “iModern conveniences.” In a couple of dailies there is an ATM and an airport X-ray machine that were necessary to set a context, but overall modern references don't exist. When Bud writes a thank you note to his grandma for a gift, he's shown handwriting it, not sending an email. I find it interesting that they use a vertical gag panel to do a multi-panel strip. Because of the simplicity of the line art they can pull it off. Sometimes the panel is split in half horizontally, sometimes vertically, sometimes horizontally with the top half is then split vertically. It's an interesting arrangement, but it works well and it's not difficult to follow the flow regardless of how they're laid out.

== Books ==
"Oh, Brother! Brat Attack!"

Andrews McMeel Publishing
