= Rae the Doe =

American comic strip

- Author: Olive Brinker
- Website: https://comicskingdom.com/rae-the-doe
- Current status/schedule: Current
- Launch date: 2020; 6 years ago
- Syndicate(s): King Features Syndicate; (2020–present)
- Genre(s): Humor, gag-a-day

Rae the Doe is an American comic strip by Olive Brinker, a cartoonist from New Jersey with a BFA in Computer Art and Animation.

== Characters ==
- Rachael Theresa Doe aka. Rae the Doe is the strip's protagonist; a gay transgender doe who is nervous, optimistic, hopeful, and very passionate about her interests
- Mimi, Rae's girlfriend. A punk skunk.
- Cybil, a moth who works as a librarian.
- Lottie, Cybil's girlfriend, an opossum who loves trash.
- Pascal, a bat who lives with Rae.
- Sawyer, a squirrel who teaches at a college.
- Olive, the cartoonist.
