= Radio Patrol (serial) =

- Cover of the 2009 DVD release.
- Directed by: Ford Beebe; Clifford Smith
- Written by: Wyndham Gittens; Norman S. Hall; Ray Trampe; Charlie Schmidt (comicstrip); Eddie Sullivan (comicstrip)
- Produced by: Ben Koenig; Barney A. Sarecky
- Starring: Grant Withers; Adrian Morris; Kay Hughes
- Cinematography: Jerome Ash
- Edited by: Saul A. Goodkind (supervising); Joseph Gluck; Louis Sackin; Alvin Todd
- Distributed by: Universal Pictures
- Release date: October 15, 1937 (U.S.)
- Running time: 12 chapters (242 minutes)
- Country: United States
- Language: English

Radio Patrol is a 1937 Universal movie serial based on the comic strip Radio Patrol.

== Premise ==
Pat O' Hara, a police officer cop, joins forces with Molly Selkirk to try to stop an international criminal gang from getting their hands on the formula for a new flexible metal.

== Cast ==
- Grant Withers as Officer Pat O'Hara
- Adrian Morris as Officer Sam Maloney
- Kay Hughes as Molly Selkirk
- Mickey Rentschler as Pinky Adams
- Silver Wolf as Irish, the German Shepherd
- Gordon Hart as W.H. Harrison
- Frank Lackteen as Mr. Tahata/Warner the Great
- C. Montague Shaw as Mr. Wellington
- Harry Davenport as John P. Adams, inventor
- Wheeler Oakman as Stevens, gang chemist
- Max Hoffman Jr. as Harry Selkirk
- Jack Mulhall as Desk Sergeant
- Earl Dwire as Jeremiah Crockett
- Leonard Lord as Franklin, the real Tahata
- Dick Botiller as Zutta, a henchman
- Tom London as Eddie Lewis (uncredited)
- Ray Teal as Perkins (uncredited)

== Production ==
Radio Patrol was based on the comic strip by Eddie Sullivan and Charles Schmidt.

=== Stunts ===
- George Magrill
- Eddie Parker (doubling Grant Withers)
- Tom Steele

== Chapter titles ==
1. A Million Dollar Murder
2. The Hypnotic Eye
3. Flaming Death
4. The Human Clue
5. The Flash of Doom
6. The House of Terror
7. Claws of Steel
8. The Perfect Crime
9. Plaything of Disaster
10. A Bargain with Death
11. The Hidden Menace
12. They Get Their Man

_{Source:}

== See also ==
- List of film serials
- List of film serials by studio

Preceded by Wild West Days (1936)	Universal Serial; Radio Patrol (1937)	Succeeded by Tim Tyler's Luck (1937)
