= Rhymes with Orange =

American comic strip

- Author(s): Hilary B. Price, Rina Piccolo
- Current status/schedule: Gag panel
- Launch date: June 1995; 30 years ago
- Syndicate(s): King Features Syndicate
- Genre: surreal humor

Rhymes with Orange is an American comic strip written and drawn by Hilary B. Price and distributed by King Features Syndicate. The title comes from the commonly held belief that no word in the English language rhymes with "orange". It was first syndicated in June 1995.

While the strip has no named recurring characters, common themes include cats, dogs, and absurdities of modern life. It appears in over 400 newspapers daily, and won the Silver Reuben for "Best Newspaper Panel Cartoon" from the National Cartoonists Society in 2007, 2009, 2012 and 2014.

Rina Piccolo has assisted Price on her comic strips since 2016 and is now a co-cartoonist with the strip.

== Collections ==
Three strip collections have been published, Rhymes with Orange (1997), Reigning Cats and Dogs (2003), and Pithy Seedy Pulpy Juicy (2007).

== See also ==
- Examples of "orange" in poetry
- Bizarro
- The Far Side
