= Safe Havens =

American comic strip

- Safe Havens Banner
- Author: Bill Holbrook
- Website: www.safehavenscomic.com
- Current status/schedule: Updating weekdays and Saturdays, no Sunday.
- Launch date: October 3, 1988; 38 years ago
- Syndicate(s): The Washington Post Writers Group (1988-1992); King Features Syndicate (1993-present)
- Genre(s): Dramedy, satire
- Preceded by: On the Fastrack

Safe Havens is a comic strip drawn by cartoonist Bill Holbrook. It was originally syndicated by The Washington Post Writers Group starting October 3, 1988 as a weekday only strip (opposite the Sunday only strip Outland by Berkeley Breathed), the strip switched to King Features Syndicate in 1993. The strip has been published in more than 50 newspapers. The strip originally concerned the group of pre-schoolers at Safe Havens Day Care, but has focused on Samantha and followed her as she has grown up (approximately in real-time) and gone through elementary school, high school, college, and (currently) marriage. The comic then went online in 2010.

The strip is located near the seashore in the fictional city of Havens, several hundred miles from the state capital. However, in 2018 the setting changed to a spaceship on a crewed mission to Mars that lasted until January 2021.

== Characters ==
Samantha, Jenny, and Dave are the only original characters left from the Day Care. Roger entered shortly after the strip began. The strip's original main character, a boy named Matt who was the son of the day care operator, was dropped early in the elementary school stretch.

=== The "Other Clique" ===
The central characters consist of students who do not belong to any of the school's established social cliques and are grouped together under the label "Other." Their unofficial mascot is a cat cloned from a dog, and the group remains open to new members.

Samantha Argus - Samantha is the main character, a woman with a hopeful nature and a genius scientific mind. However, she is a bit of a control freak and often attempts to help people, even when they don't need it. Her technical side enables her to see the world rationally and realistically, which comes in handy when you're surrounded by a mermaid, the spirit of a late grandmother, living dust bunnies and a genetic mishap that turned the family border collie into a school guidance counselor. She is now married to Dave Hamper and gave birth to their firstborn in September 2018. Her role on the mission to Mars was commander, or as she puts it, "Rocket Administrator". Since the mission's return she has been named head of the genetics lab where Rupert and Rosalind work.

Dave Hamper - Dave is dyslexic, but found that instead of it being a disability it's simply an alternate yet perfectly viable way of interfacing with the world. He uses his unique special talents to achieve stardom on the basketball court. He was stationed with "Nuova Pallacanestro Firenze", a team in Florence, Italy, but retired in 2016 due to an ACL injury. He is married to Samantha Argus, who he has been soulmates with since almost the beginning. His role on the mission to Mars was Pilot.

Jenny Fuerte - Jenny is vain, shallow and self-centered, possessing a set of personal ethics that could charitably be called "situational". She is everything that Samantha is not. Contrastingly, the two have been friends since preschool. She has been Dave and Bambi's agent since college. She is married to Luis Fuerte and has a daughter, Candide.

Thomas Volant - Thomas is naturally acrobatic, has since infancy preferred being on a trapeze. He has performed for Cirque du Soleil. He is married to Remora and they have a son, Marlon, who took after him by hanging on a trapeze. His role on the mission to Mars was co-pilot.

Roger - Roger has been practising to become a mascot his entire life. Rarely seen outside of costume, he was the mascot of the Havens High School Fighting Personal Digital Assistants (the team used to be called the Lions until a "contribution" from a high-tech firm resulted in the name change). Roger takes his mascot role incredibly seriously, communicating entirely through the costume's screen display. Roger's face has never been shown since he is always wearing some sort of full-body costume. Even in the day care, he wore a box, and then made it into a television costume. He was on the mission to Mars as the Main Computer interface.

Remora - Remora is a 415-year-old mermaid who has decided to live on land for a while. Like all merfolk, she has the option of living 24 hours a day as half-fish, half human (i.e., Mermaid Classic), or for twelve hours fully human followed by twelve hours as a fish. In summer of 2006, she decided to take a vacation in the ocean with friends. From that time, she spent the summer months at sea. She and Thomas Volant have a son, Marlon, who has exhibited traits of both Remora's merfolk heritage and Thomas' acrobatic predilection. She was on the mission to Mars as the grower of organic foodstuffs in the water tank. During the loss of ship emergency at the end of the mission she shape-shifted and ended as half-human half-octopus.

Bambi Bramante - Bambi's goal in life was to be a successful poet, but frequently suffered from writer's block. However, her life plans took a different path after it was discovered that she had a wonderful singing voice, and she became the songwriter and lead singer of the clique's garage band, the Safe Havens. Jenny signed them to a record contract, but the label only wanted Bambi. So she soon embarked on a solo career. However, her own self doubts and esteem issues caused her issues, and to help keep her head above water, members of the "Other" clique would accompany her on the tour. She was on the mission to Mars as token celebrity to keep the media on them, and was writing and recording her next album while on the trip. In 2020 she and Maria fell in love and became a couple.

Luis Fuerte - A hunk with eyeglasses, Hispanic background and a wheelchair. He joins the "Other" clique in High School. He is an excellent mechanic and a clandestine inventor, evident as the creator of an extendable arm that provides Samantha with a convenient alibi during a basketball game (strips of December 1–5, 2008). He is married to Jenny and is the father of Candide. His role on the mission to Mars is chief mechanic.

Ming Delft - Ming is only honorarily a member of the "other clique". A "goth" enthusiast with a flair for the extreme and avant-garde, introduced when Dave Hamper was traded to another high school for his senior year. Initially a pseudo-rival to Samantha for Dave (she always wore sunglasses a la Dave, shedding them only when she got married), she was eventually accepted into the group and joined everyone at Havens University as a creative film major. She shared a college dorm room with Samantha, Remora and Jenny before marrying Don Delft, a former teammate of Dave on the college's basketball team who was drafted by the NBA in the spring of 2008. Don is so tall that his face was never seen; his head extended above the top of the strip until he posed for a family portrait with his new baby on January 2, 2012. Ming and Don's son is Clay.

Gerald, Lisa, and Winston - All members of the "Other Clique" in junior and senior high school. However, following high school they went elsewhere to college and were written out of the comic.

=== Samantha's family ===
Donald Argus - Donald is the safety inspector at Fastrack, Inc. (in crossover with On the Fastrack, another comic strip by Holbrook) and is more frequently seen in that comic.

Jeanine Argus - Started on the school board when Samantha was in high school, then became a state senator. In 2008, she was elected lieutenant governor. After one term was elected governor in 2012. Initially, Jeanine seemed clueless as to the genetic (and other) shenanigans that occurred around Samantha's life, but it is later revealed that she knew the whole time and was ready to step in if Samantha couldn't fix anything. In 2021 she is president of Beige University.

Sophie Argus - Samantha's little sister. She accidentally drank some butterfly DNA as a child and was thus enhanced with extreme grace and agility which she uses to take up dancing.

Shondra Argus - Shondra left school to become an artist and lived in the state capitol. However, she became disillusioned with that lifestyle in her 30s and returned to college, where she took courses to become a relationship counselor.

Sylvester and Steve - Rarely seen, Sylvester and Steve are Samantha's older brothers. Both went into business related fields and only ever seen on the holidays.

Grandma Argus - When the mother of Samantha's mom died, she left Samantha a magic ring. When wearing it, Samantha can speak to her grandmother in any reflection. A former daredevil with a wealth of adventurous experiences, she sees her post-life duty as making sure Samantha doesn't spend her years glued to the front of a computer screen.

Laptop a.k.a. Dr. Brenda Scrim - Originally, the Argus's pet border collie (it was later discovered she was also half cat), Laptop later created a fictional character of Brenda Scrim to pose as the Guidance Counselor for Havens Junior High School. When it became apparent she was needed personally, she took a genetic concoction created by Samantha to become human. She later chose this as her permanent life, becoming the high school counselor and later Jeanine's political adviser. She was originally married to Dave's dog Clive until his death, and later married the state's governor (while Jeanine was lieutenant governor). She is the adopted mother of Palmtop, her genetic clone, and was the legal guardian of Remora.

Palmtop a.k.a. Pam Topp - Samantha's first genetic experiment, Palmtop is genetic clone of Samantha's border collie Laptop. She was gestated in a cat and was born a cat (this was later discovered being due to Laptop being a dog/cat hybrid). Palmtop originally showed more of a canine personality than a feline, but this would later change as she developed a snarky feline persona. She briefly had a romance with an escaped lab experiment and they had a litter of striped puppies which were adopted by many of the main characters (most have since been written out). Palmtop eventually became human under the unfortunate name "Pam Topp", and served as the Residential Adviser in Samantha's old dorm. More recently she has decided to live as a cat, in Vince and Feryl's home, and only occasionally transforms into Pam Topp.

=== Residents of Havens ===
Miss Callowood - Miss Callowood was the kids' elementary school teacher for several years. She had been rather trendy before becoming a teacher and had several facial piercings, although her face was never actually seen. She left teaching after getting married and having a child, and would only be seen during the Junior High years when Samantha would babysit for her. She returned occasionally during the High School and College years after it was discovered Dave was dyslexic, as a special education teacher to help Dave learn to read.

Miss Havens - Miss Havens was the operator of the day care and Matt's mother. She also was dropped when the kids entered elementary school, although she returned for a couple years as the day care teacher for the new generation. She also prepared the children's lesson plans for while they are on the mission to Mars.

=== Beige University characters ===
Rupert and Rosalind - Samantha's research assistants. Accident prone, they frequently suffer from genetic mishaps that result in them changing into other animals or assuming their traits. They are married and have a son, Gregor, who has inherited some Venus Flytrap DNA and thus has green skin, conducts photosynthesis, and likes to chomp things that fly.

Patina and Rusty Welding - Crossover characters from On the Fastrack, Patina goes to college at Beige University, is the Residential Adviser in Samantha's old dorm, originally alongside Palmtop, and is currently seen more often here than in On The Fastrack. Samantha entrusted her genetic supplies to Patina for safe-keeping during her expedition to Mars. During the expedition Rusty also enrolled at Beige University and replaced Pam Topp as the other resident advisor. One of their current jobs is to keep the media away from Samantha and Dave.

Vince Vole - A mouse that was turned into a human after an accident. He's decided to stay human and works in Samantha's lab and is an English major. He occasionally turns back into a mouse for the summer, and has since lost his tail in an accident. He dated and later married Feryl Farnsworth; they have a daughter named Morgana, appropriately for two people who give magic shows.

Feryl Farnsworth - Formerly a dove that as a chick got turned into a human accidentally, and was raised as the daughter of the scientist/magician that transformed her; she occasionally turns back into a dove. She married Vince Vole, and they have a human daughter, named Morgana, appropriately for two magicians. She, and Vince, and Pam Topp regularly give magician shows for children, in which one of them is in animal form for the show. While Samantha was off to Mars only Vince transformed, because they were short of transformational elixir and Patina Welding was rationing it.

Maria - A former time traveler, served as doctor on the mission to Mars. She and Bambi fell in love, became a couple and now live together. She corrected Leo, saying that she can't time-travel any more because then she will be unable to return to this time the same time as her younger self Maria Hamper. See Leo and Maria Hamper below.

The Dodos, Paul and Mary - Samantha's graduate thesis work was to recreate and study the extinct species of dodo. To do this she found and extrapolated dodo DNA and turned two chickens into Dodos. Much to her surprise, she discovers that dodos were intelligent beings capable of speech, but have little to no sense of morals, ethics or self-preservation. They constantly seek fame and fortune, and it has since been an ongoing task to keep them out of trouble. They joined the mission to Mars as stowaways, and decided to remain there after the planet developed an ecosystem.

Stan - Stan is a giant spider that lives in the duct work in the lab, and was tasked with keeping the dodos from escaping.

=== The Children, a.k.a. "The Next Generation" ===
All of these children were also on the Mission to Mars.

Marlon Fontenalia-Volant Marlon is the son of Remora and Thomas and the eldest of the children. He takes after his father's acrobatic inclinations, and prefers to hang from a trapeze. In 2014, Marlon began to show Remora's aquatic merfolk heritage as well, and has to spend 12 hours a day as a fish.

Candide Fuerte - Luis and Jenny's first child, born New Year's, 2012, simultaneously with Clay. Very competitive with Clay. She shows her mother's tendency for material acquisition.

Clay Delft - Don and Ming's first child, born New Year's, 2012, simultaneously with Candide. Very competitive with Candide.

Leo - Son of Maria, see above. Leo is also a time traveler. He will grow up to be Leonardo da Vinci.

Maria Hamper - Sam and Dave's first child, born September 2018. The strip of May 20, 2020 states that Maria will grow up to be Leo's mother. The same week Leo says that his mother can not come visit 'here' because she can not be in the same time space as her toddler self Maria Hamper.

== Book collections ==
Title	Publication Date	ISBN	Contents	Publisher
The Safe Havens Yearbook	March 2000	ISBN 1-9294-6202-6	Contains strips from 1998.	Plan Nine Publishing
Dancing on the Basketball Court	September 2000	ISBN 1-9294-6216-6	Contains strips from 1999.	Plan Nine Publishing
Bottom Feeders	August 2001	ISBN 1-9294-6232-8	Contains strips from 2000.	Plan Nine Publishing
Over the Swing	November 2002	ISBN 1-9294-6255-7	Contains strips from 1997.	Plan Nine Publishing
Teacher of the Year	June 2003	ISBN 1-9294-6262-X	Contains strips from 2001.	Plan Nine Publishing
Party Animal	December 2003	ISBN 1-9294-6277-8	Contains strips from 2002.	Plan Nine Publishing
Meet Safe Havens	May 2004	ISBN 1-9294-6282-4	Contains strips from 2003.	Plan Nine Publishing
Ming's Dynasty	February 2005	ISBN 1-9294-6216-6	Contains strips from 2004.	Plan Nine Publishing
Taking Wing	September 2009	ISBN 0-9748-9155-X	Contains strips from 2005.	Moonbase Press
Resident Advisor	September 2010	ISBN 1-9359-3302-7	Contains strips from 2006.	Moonbase Press
Extreme Vows	December 2010	ISBN 1-9294-6216-6	Contains strips from 2007.	Moonbase Press
On Tour	December 2011	ISBN 978-1-9359-3315-1	Contains strips from 2008.	Moonbase Press
I Married A Mermaid!	January 2013	ISBN 978-1-9395-4412-4	Contains strips from 2009.	Pencil Rough Productions
Viva Safe Havens	November 2013	ISBN 978-1-9395-4414-8	Contains strips from 2010.	Pencil Rough Productions
Gest8: A Tale of Two Pregnancies	December 2014	ISBN 978-1-9395-4421-6	Contains strips from 2011.	Pencil Rough Productions
Safe Havens Treasury: The Daycare Years	September 2015	ISBN 978-1-9395-4424-7	Contains strips from 1988 and 1989.	Pencil Rough Productions
Mudslide	December 2015	ISBN 978-1-9395-4428-5	Contains strips from 2012.	Pencil Rough Productions
