= Tulipop =

Icelandic brand

- Founded: 2010; 15 years ago
- Founders: Signy Kolbeinsdottir; Helga Arnadottir
- Headquarters: Reykjavík, Iceland
- Website: www.tulipop.com

Tulipop is an Icelandic entertainment brand founded in 2010. The company's original product line was a series of plush figures that resembled elements of nature, such as mushrooms and trees. The company went on to develop these characters, called Tulipoppers, in a variety of media, including a children's cartoon series that was released on YouTube in 2017.

== Characters ==
- Gloomy: A mushroom girl, she is relentlessly adventurous, curious, and self-interested. She loves to explore, willing to go anywhere and do anything, particularly if it has never been done before, and even better if she can find a way to add her own twisted style to it, often dragging her reluctant brother Bubble along too. She is a loyal friend and sister but when she is interested in something, everything else falls out of view, especially if she is sourcing new ingredients for her potions, even if this leads her and her friends into the darker corners of Tulipop.
- Bubble: Not at all like his active sister, Bubble prefers to spend his days at home, eating blueberry pancakes, gardening, reading and taking a nap. Highly intelligent, embracing logic and learning, and suspicious of feelings Bubble does everything slowly. He is curious about the world but in a passive way, only finding new fun-facts makes Bubble really excited. Self-deprecating and fatalistic, he can be very funny too!
- Fred: The smelliest and least threatening monster imaginable. Fred is naïve, temperamental, easily distracted, prone to eating random things, and definitely fun to be around. He's furry, horned and constantly regenerates but never matures. Fred is afraid of the dark so it is helpful that his horns can glow. While he is naturally big, cute and soft, he can also bust out his more unhinged animalistic side when necessary.
- Miss Maddy: A bear, outgoing, confident, vocally gifted and a mistress of sass, she is Tulipop's resident diva. She works very hard to appear as a classy, elegant, and softly-spoken lady so that people will not see the real her, which is actually a monster like Fred, but she dyes her fur white and turquoise and files down her horns. She is a bit like a big sister to the other Tulipoppers, bossy and arrogant, you have to do what she says, but it is always worth it because you get to hang out with the fabulous Miss Maddy.
- Mama Skully: The creator of Tulipop island, this ageless matriarch is the oldest inhabitant. She is insightful, manipulative, crotchety and clever. Mama Skully can harness the powers of Tulipop and do spectacular things, and she has the uncanny ability to materialize, seemingly out of nowhere. She is all about her own personal amusement and can't resist using her power to mess with people, often playing innocent pranks. Laughing is what helps her maintain her youthful glow.
- Mr. Tree: An old, magic tree who lives with Mama Skully on Skull Rock. He is mild mannered, wise, warm-hearted and likes to tree-splain everything to anyone who will listen. He is a hoarder, and stores diamonds, gems, trinkets, and snacks in his branches because you never know when something will come in useful. His diamond collection grows every time he sheds a tear – because Mr Tree cries diamonds.

== Inspiration ==
Signý Kolbeinsdóttir, Tulipop's creator, has spoken in interviews about the inspiration for the Tulipop characters as being inspired by real people, especially her friends and family members.

Signý uses the characters to portray people who are flawed and complex. The dark fantasy world of Tulipop also stems from its Icelandic heritage. Like Iceland, Tulipop is a volcanic island and the stories can be dark, in line with Icelandic folklore.

The Tulipop world is also influenced by characters and children's toys such as Barbapapa, Monchhichi, Hello Kitty, and Little Twin Stars.

== Merchandise ==
In 2015, Tulipop signed a deal with Toynami, an American toy company. Toynami developed a range of Tulipop items, both plush toys and vinyl figurines, featuring the four main characters, Bubble, Gloomy, Fred and Miss Maddy.

Tulipop has since signed cross-category US licensing agreements with Loungefly (accessories), Mighty Fine (apparel), Pyramid (stationary), Mad Dog (socks), and Jay Franco (bedding). In November 2017, Tulipop partnered with Hot Topic in the US to sell Tulipop products in its 600 stores across the US. To celebrate the partnership, Signý Kolbeinsdóttir worked with Venice Art Walls to create a colorful Tulipop mural on the Venice Art Walls located in Venice, California.

Since its founding, Tulipop has also signed with UK resellers, including the House of Fraser department store in 2016.

As of February 2018, Tulipop products are available in 350 stores in 14 countries. In Iceland, home of Tulipop, 25 stores sell the Tulipop product range.

== Awards ==
In 2013, Tulipop won the "Encouragement Award", awarded by FKA, The Association of Women Business Leaders in Iceland. The company also received "Start-up of the Year 2015" from Viðskiptablaðið. In addition, Tulipop was shortlisted for the Best Interiors Collection Junior Design Award 2014. It was awarded "Best Newcomer" at the Smallish Design Awards 2015 and was nominated for a LIMA award in 2018.
