= Gearhead Gertie =

NASCAR-themed American comic strip

- Author: Mike Smith
- Website: Official site
- Current status/schedule: running
- Launch date: 17 February 2019; 7 years ago
- Syndicate(s): Comics Kingdom
- Genre: Stock car racing

Gearhead Gertie is a weekly syndicated comic strip written by American editorial cartoonist Mike Smith. A single-panel, full-color, "joke-a-day" comic strip, it focuses on an older woman named Gertie who is obsessed with stock car racing.

== Characters and format ==
Gertie, an elderly woman with curly white hair and red earrings, appears in every strip. According to the creator, she is intended to demonstrate the wide range of racing fandom.

Each installment's punchline highlights Gertie's "monomaniacal" interest in NASCAR to the point of alienating her friends and family She occasionally appears with members of her family, including her husband, who is usually frustrated with her obsession. According to Comics Curmudgeon author Josh Fruhlinger, Gearhead Gertie strips sometimes provide commentary on a recent NASCAR story or controversy, while others give Gertie an opportunity to convey her obsession to an interlocutor who doesn't share or understand it.

== Background ==
From 1998 to 2002, in addition to his syndicated work as an editorial cartoonist at the Las Vegas Sun, Mike Smith published a weekly syndicated strip called StockCarToons. The Gertie character originated in this series. On February 17, 2019―the day of the Daytona 500―he debuted the new strip featuring Gertie. Since 2021, it has been syndicated and distributed by King Features Syndicate's Comics Kingdom digital platform.

== Reception ==
Pop culture reviewer Nathan Rabin described Gearhead Gertie as "mind-bogglingly terrible in a weirdly fascinating way," calling it "surreally lazy" for its narrow focus. He described Gertie's particular obsession with Dale Earnhardt as "something that comes up in strip after strip and, like the strip as a whole, is never funny but weirdly fascinating in its single-minded stupidity."

After several months commenting on Gearhead Gertie on his blog, Fruhlinger noted that "there's only so much material we can get out of 'Gertie sure loves NASCAR,' so it makes sense that the strip is actually pivoting towards 'Gertie's husband sure hates how much Gertie loves NASCAR, like you can tell it's destroying their marriage and every day he dies a little bit more inside, but she can't see it.'"

== See also ==
- Portrayal of women in comics
