= Moose & Molly =

American comic strip by Bob Weber

- Author: Bob Weber
- Launch date: September 20, 1965
- End date: April 5, 2020
- Alternate name(s): Moose (1965–1971); Moose Miller (1971–1998)
- Syndicate(s): King Features Syndicate

Moose & Molly is an American comic strip by Bob Weber, published by King Features Syndicate. It began on September 20, 1965, as Moose, and retitled Moose Miller six years later. It was renamed Moose & Molly in 1998. In April 2020, Bob Weber retired the comic strip. Weber based many of Moose's adventures on his own family's experiences.

== Characters ==
- Moose Miller is a "lazy, out-of-work, out-of-shape loafer". He has a communal attitude to other people's property and often helps himself to food from his neighbours' refrigerator or invites his friends over to spend the afternoon in their swimming pool. Despite this he seems quite popular, perhaps due to his perpetually cheerful demeanour. Despite his laziness, he can be quite handy at times.
- Molly Miller is Moose's loving and extremely tolerant wife. About the only thing she would change about her husband would be to have him get around to his household repairs a little quicker She has a playful sense of humour and shares her husband's propensity for mooching; the pair often invite themselves to friends' houses for dinner.
- Bunky Miller is Moose and Molly's first child, a teenager who takes after his father.
- Blip Miller is the middle child of the Miller family.
- Cindy Miller is the youngest of the three children.
- Chester Crabtree is Moose's neighbour, best friend and worst enemy. He likes Moose, but is often annoyed by his mooching.
- Clara Crabtree is Chester's wife, and is much more tolerant of Moose's antics than her husband is.
- Jack Wilson is Molly's brother, almost always referred to as "my brother Jack" by Molly and "your brother Jack" by Moose. Like Moose, he rarely seems to have trouble finding employment, but never manages to keep the job for long.
- Mrs. Wilson, Molly and Jack's mother, loves snooping on the neighbours and gossiping with Molly. Despite her snooping, criminals tend to get caught thanks to her.

=== Pets ===
The Millers own a number of animals including at least two dogs (Bowser and Butch) and a cat (Tabby).
