= Radio Patrol (comic strip) =

American comic strip by Eddie Sullivan and Charles Schmidt

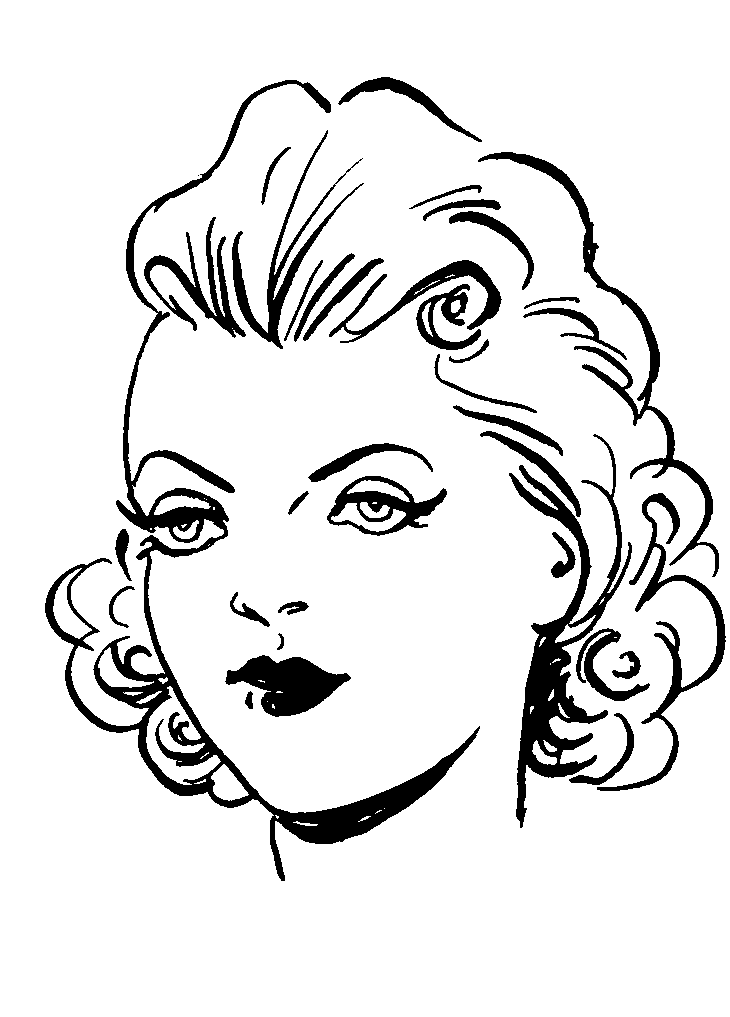
- Molly Day from Radio Patrol
- Author(s): Eddie Sullivan
- Illustrator(s): Charles Schmidt
- Current status/schedule: Concluded daily & Sunday strip
- Launch date: August 7, 1933
- End date: December 16, 1950
- Alternate name(s): Pinkerton, Jr. Sgt. Pat of Radio Patrol
- Syndicate(s): King Features Syndicate
- Genre(s): Crime, Adventure

Radio Patrol is a police comic strip carried in newspapers from August 7, 1933, to December 16, 1950, in the dailies, with a Sunday strip that ran from November 25, 1934, to October 20, 1946. It was created by artist Charles Schmidt and writer Eddie Sullivan, who both worked for the Boston American. Sullivan was a newspaper reporter who specialized in crime reporting.

Because of the popularity of Dick Tracy, William Randolph Hearst wanted a strip in his King Features Syndicate to compete. The strip, which started in 1933 in the Boston Record, was originally called Pinkerton, Jr., since the main character was a boy named Pinky. (Dick Tracy also had a boy as a key character at the time.) The new strip was popular with Boston readers and the main character shortly became Sergeant Pat, while Pinky grew older quite rapidly. Sergeant Pat was a composite of many of the real-life Boston Police Department officers Sullivan knew personally. When the strip was picked up by King Features Syndicate in 1934, it was retitled Radio Patrol.

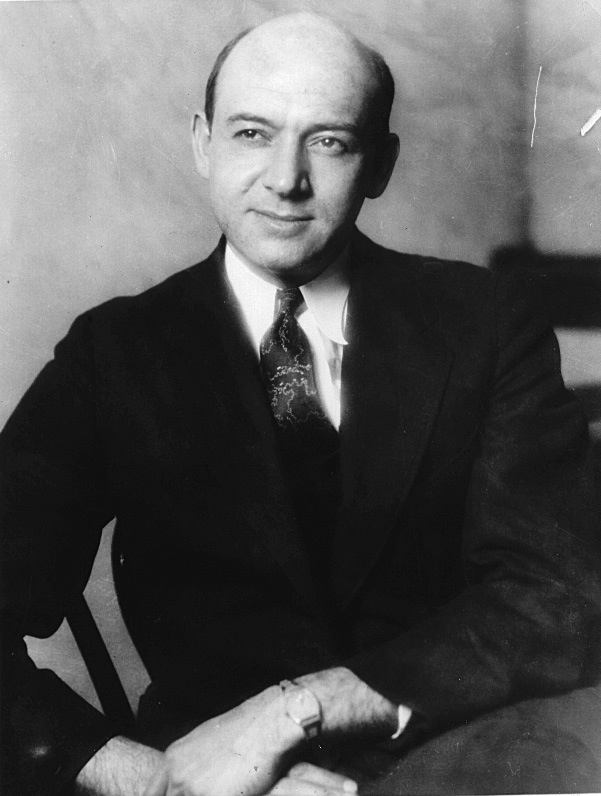
Charles Schmidt (1940)

The central characters were Sergeant Pat, his partner Sam and policewoman Molly Day. Later retitled Sgt. Pat of Radio Patrol, the strip is notable for its serious tone, with little evidence of the fantastic or supernatural. The realistic bent even included accurate geography in its depictions of Boston and the New England countryside.

Whenever artist Charlie Schmidt bought a new car, it was drawn into the strip as Sergeant Pat's new cruiser. One day Schmidt was at his dentist's office. The dentist wanted to know how come he wasn't one of the characters in the popular strip. Schmidt replied, "Because I already have one fat guy in it."

Walter Howey, the editor who assigned Schmidt and Sullivan to create the comic strip, was a personal friend of Hearst, and in Citizen Kane Howey's was fictionalized as Jed Leland (Joseph Cotten).

As with other strips of the period, Radio Patrol was adapted into different media, including a 1930s radio show. The 12-chapter Universal Pictures movie serial, Radio Patrol (1937), starring Grant Withers as Pat, was directed by Ford Beebe and Clifford Smith.

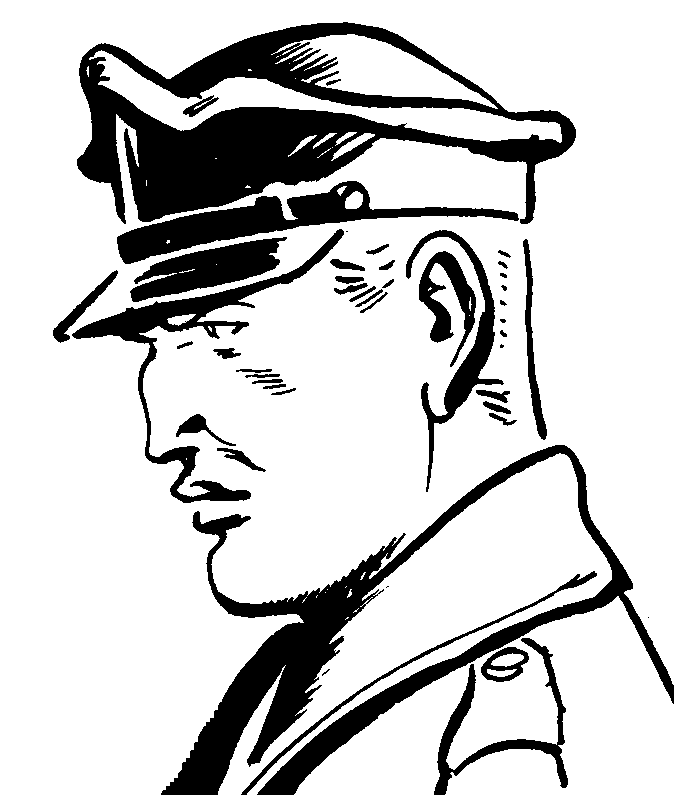
Sergeant Pat

In June 2010, Radio Patrol was added to King Features' DailyINK email service, which was later transitioned to ComicsKingdom.com.
