= South Baltimore, Baltimore =

South Baltimore
- Neighborhood
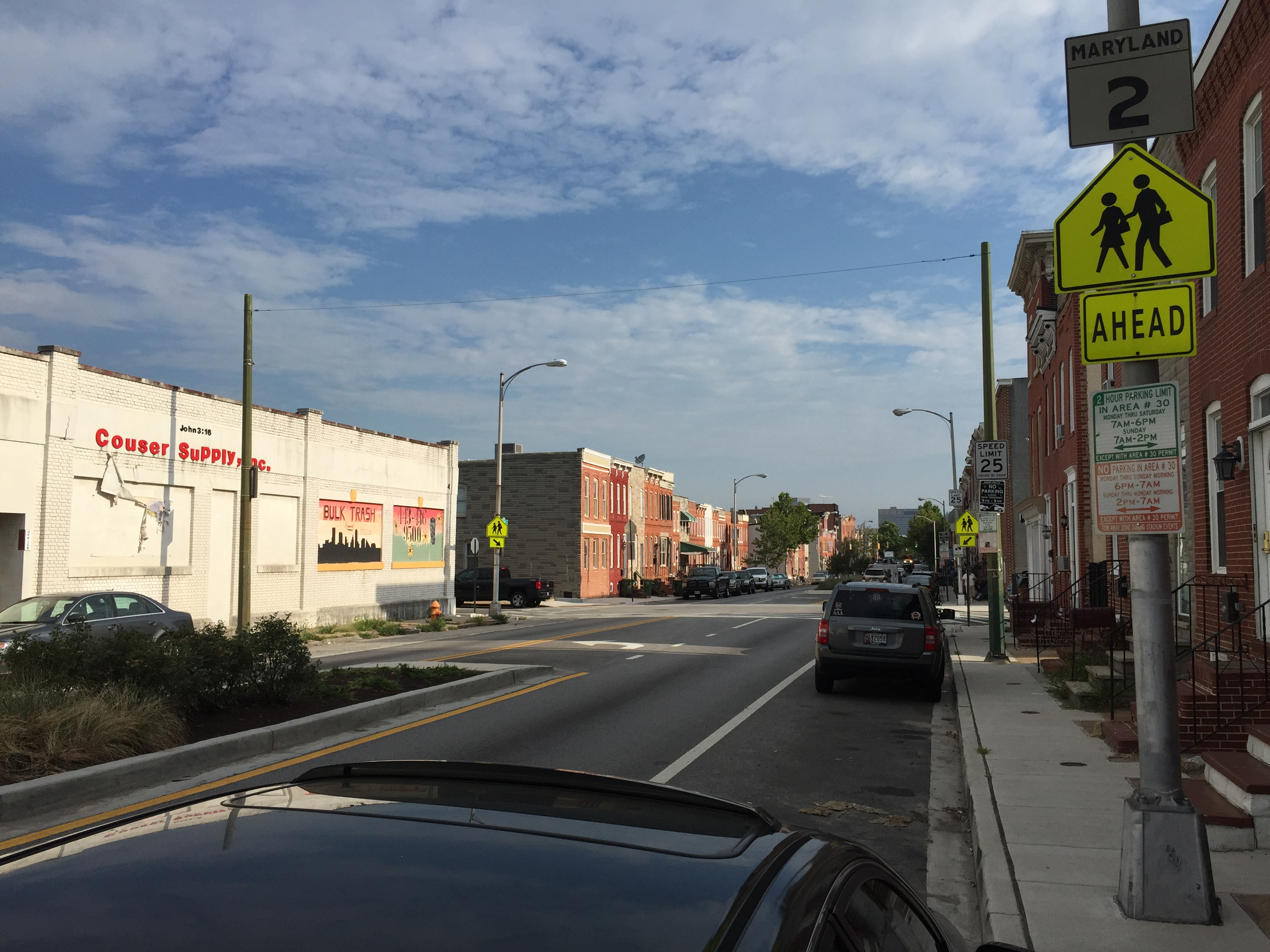
- 1800 block of Hanover Street in South Baltimore, Baltimore
- Nickname: SoBo
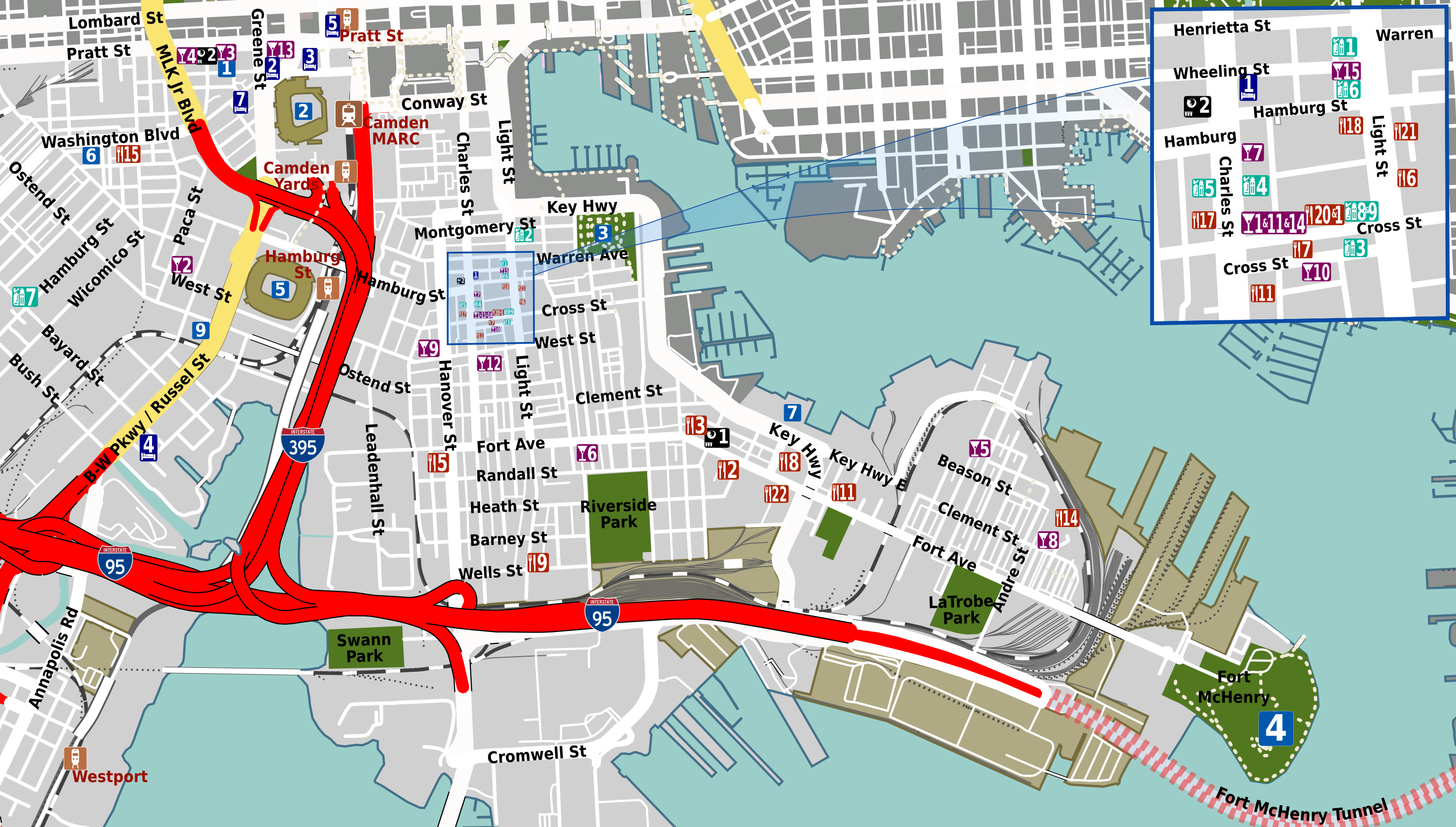
- Coordinates: 39.2705°N 76.6137°W
- Country: United States
- State: Maryland
- City: Baltimore
- Time zone: UTC-5 (Eastern)
  - Summer (DST): UTC-4 (EDT)
- ZIP code: 21230
- Area code: 410, 443, and 667

South Baltimore is a neighborhood in the Southern District of Baltimore, located to the west of the neighborhood of Riverside and south of Federal Hill. Its boundaries are marked by East Ostend Street (north), Light Street (east), Race Street (west) and Interstate 95 (south).

== Landmarks ==
Heath Street Park, a small neighborhood park, is located along Heath Street between South Charles Street and Harden Court.

== See also ==
- List of Baltimore neighborhoods
