= Tina's Groove =

American comic strip by Rina Piccolo

- Rina Piccolo's Tina's Groove (January 29, 2012).
- Author: Rina Piccolo
- Launch date: 2002
- End date: July 2, 2017
- Syndicate(s): King Features Syndicate
- Publisher: Andrews McMeel Publishing
- Genre: Humor

Tina's Groove is a Canadian comic strip by Rina Piccolo with a restaurant setting. Distributed by King Features Syndicate, it began in 2002. The comic strip ended its run on July 2, 2017.

== Characters and story ==
"Tina's Groove chronicled the personal and workplace adventures of a single, smart, attractive waitress who worked at Pepper's restaurant. Shrewdly self-aware, Tina refuted clichéd notions of single women as neurotics obsessed with career or marriage. Tina found her groove and empowered herself by embracing life and everyone she met head-on."

- Tina works as a waitress at Pepper's Restaurant and is "happy being Tina", living life rather than waiting for it to begin. She is described as "smart, funny and real", an everywoman in her 30s who "struggles to deal with her job, dating and the ups and downs of day-to-day living".
- Gus, Tina's boyfriend, whom she met at a speed dating event in 2012.
- Suzanne, Tina's best friend and fellow waitress is "always looking for a good time" and enjoys casual relationships with a large number of men.
- Monica, the hostess at Pepper's, is spacey and oblivious. Maybe she sees things others don't, or maybe she's just crazy. She is hopelessly in love with Rob, although the feeling is not mutual.
- Carlos the chef is known for his ego and his outdated views on gender and romance.
- Rob the general manager is shy and reserved, but a bit of a control freak.
- Other recurring characters include Claud the taxi driver, Tina's mother, Jake the bartender, and various unnamed customers.

Piccolo offered her description of the characters on July 4, 2012:

Tina's imperfections, if she has any, are of the kind that are quirky, and therefore endearing. This is good for a cartoon character. I believe the main character of a comic strip should be one that's likable. But does that mean the main character should be flawless? It's the weaknesses, or fixations, that make characters interesting. The other characters of the strip all have fixations that make them imperfect. Rob, the manager of Pepper's Restaurant, is a misfit neat/control freak who hasn't yet realized that it's now cool to be a geek. Carlos is a sack of testosterone who must prove himself to be the manliest at any cost. Suzanne is a spoiled 30 something flake who has so many weaknesses she's created a personality out of being less than perfect. And then there's Monica. If you read the strip then I don't have to waste my words on Monica. Tina stands apart. One good reason for this is that Tina is what's known in the comedy world as the “Straight Man”. She's the only sane character in a world of insanity. In the strip she represents logic, the voice of reason, while every one else is crazy. This is where most of the humor comes from.

Readers have wondered if Tina is depressed or deeply worried about something, but Piccolo explains that this impression is mistaken and may be an inadvertent effect of Tina's hairstyle, specifically the hair bangs being drawn "at the same angle that you'd use to draw a 'worried eyebrow' expression".

"Tina's not depressed — no more than any other person. When I started the strip I didn't know a lot about her, but I did know what I didn't want her to be. I didn't want my main character to be sappy and sickeningly sweet. I wanted to write her as a girl who had real-world traits who just happened to be nice in a normal, non-mushy way... The thing is, I don't want Tina to be smiling in every situation — that would be sappy."

The strip ran in such newspapers as the Cincinnati Enquirer, the Arizona Republic and the Toronto Star, and it is also available through King Features' DailyINK email service.

== Books ==
In 2006, Andrews & McMeel published Tina's Groove: A Cartoon Collection (ISBN 978-0740756979), collecting selected strips from its first few years.
