= On the Fastrack =

American comic strip by Bill Holbrook

- Author: Bill Holbrook
- Current status/schedule: Daily comic (since 1984)
- Launch date: March 19, 1984; 41 years ago
- Syndicate(s): King Features Syndicate
- Genre: Humor
- Followed by: Safe Havens

On the Fastrack is a comic strip drawn by Bill Holbrook about the curious characters employed at the fictional data storage firm Fastrack, Inc. Launched March 19, 1984, it was initially distributed by King Features Syndicate to 50 newspapers worldwide, later increasing to 75 papers. King Features offers this summary of the strip:

On the Fastrack chronicles the comic misadventures at Fastrack Inc., a wry mirror of the contemporary work scene. Ruthless boss Rose Trellis runs Fastrack, Inc. and thrives in an atmosphere of corporate political intrigue and back-stabbing. ... The strip is sprinkled with office romance, computer technology mayhem and lovesick moat monsters.

== Publication history ==
For the first 18 years of its publication, the comic was a "gag a day" strip", with the characters aging very slowly. However, in early 2002, Holbrook explicitly switched to a real time format, wherein the characters aged in real time. This kept On The Fastrack in tandem with its companion strip Safe Havens, which shares some of its characters. However, by the 2010s, characters returned to aging somewhat slowly.

== Characters and story ==
The strip has changed focus several times over the years, though always maintaining lead characters who work at the large firm of Fastrack, Inc.

For the first few years, the strip was originally centered around Bob Shirt, a slightly nebbishy but likable middle-management employee; Melody Acapella, his attractive co-worker; Melody’s daughter Laurel; Art Welding, another co-worker; Bud Spore, these workers' immediate supervisor, then age 17; and the CEO, Rose Trellis.

By the late 1980s, the focal characters were the Weldings: Art and Wendy and their children, Rusty and Patina. Bud, Rose, and (to a lesser extent) Bob and Melody were supporting characters. Bob and Melody, once the lead characters, receded in importance over the years, but still appeared in the strip occasionally, since Melody ran the company day care center, where Patina and Rusty spent their after-school hours. In 2021 Bud indicated that Melody no longer works for the company.

In 2010, Wendy's new assistant, Dethany Dendrobia, was introduced, and arguably became the star of the strip. A smart, generally cheerful, extremely competent Goth, Dethany's appearance consistently leads people to underestimate or misjudge her.

The strip's characters include:

- Rose Trellis – the owner of Fastrack, Inc. whose imperial nature conceals a seldom-seen charitable side.
- Wendy Rommel Welding – Rose's assistant, who does much of the day-to-day work of running Fastrack. She earned a Ph.D. in 2010.
- Art Welding – Wendy's unambitious husband, who "works" in the computer room.
- Rusty and Patina Welding, their children, who lead an online existence their parents are only dimly aware of, battling the Y2K bug as 2000 approached and assisting Santa Claus with their computer skills. Patina in 2018 is seen more often at Safe Havens, where she has custody of Samantha Argus's genetic supplies while Samantha travels to Mars. By 2021 both were resident advisors to the dorm at Havens College that Samantha once lived in. Patina graduated from Havens and has worked at Fastrack since the summer of 2022. She is disguised as one of Dethany's "long-lost relatives" because she really wanted to work at Fastrack but on her own merit. Only Rose is oblivious to her real identity.
- Bud Spore, the head of Fastrack’s Information Technology Center, a stereotypical computer geek. On April 25, 2010, he started his own blog, Spore Sample, in which he comments on various aspects of Fastrack as well as his family life with:
  - His wife, Chelonia, the daughter of Rose.
  - Their daughter, Cookie, who "takes after her [maternal] grandmother in all ways, save that she’s too young to have read Machiavelli." She and Rusty revealed their marriage in May 2023.
- Dethany Dendrobia – Wendy's assistant, a 25-year-old (in 2016) Goth who is defined by her conscientious work ethic, intelligence, and talent, and mainly her ability to confound others' expectations based on her appearance. She was hired after Wendy earned her Ph.D. Originally named Bethany, she changed her name when she turned 21. Dethany has also appeared in the Dick Tracy comic strip as an informer on the villain Rikki Mortis. Dethany in 2018 also served as mission manager of the Fastrack One mission to Mars at Safe Havens.
- Guy Wire - Formerly a security officer at Fastrack, since 2020 married to Dethany and promoted to work computer security under Bud.
- Ada Counter – A midwife whose former career was in computers and who now consults at Fastrack. She goes out with Chelonia's twin brother, Mark Domain.
- The Moat Monster – A dragon-like creature that was spawned by Fastrack’s toxic waste dump. Currently in charge of corporate security. The Moat Monster is capable of shapeshifting into the form of an attractive green-haired human woman who uses the alias "Candy Moatmonster." She has an ongoing cyberspace love affair with an IRS agent (who knows her true form). Since the start of the COVID-19 pandemic, she only appears in Zoom meetings on Sundays to showcase her green hair.
- Fistula Breech – Company accountant in her late thirties who is almost always addressed as Fi (pronounced "fee"). She was one of the earliest bloggers, writing one in 1993 while at college. She and Dethany are distant relatives via a pair of sisters who lived in Yorkshire in the early nineteenth century. Though she originally had a strong dislike for Dethany, the two have since worked well with each other, as evident in the Office Oracles videos that originated on YouTube and are now also a part of its own actual website since December 2021.
- Don Argus – The safety manager at Fastrack. His daughter Samantha is the principal character in Safe Havens. During her college years she worked summers at Fastrack assisting Bud Spore.
- Philby Fenster – Rose's ex-husband (and Chelonia's father), a hacker and convicted embezzler whose skills are so formidable that he managed to hack his way out of prison on more than one occasion (in a continuing story arc beginning in late August 2007, by using an abacus).
- Thornton Saguaro – Married to Rose, he is the CEO of another company and as flinty as his wife. After the two met she asked him to be a member of her board of directors, where he provides the challenge that she needs. He set up a charitable foundation so that they could have something to work on together. He has been described as politically liberal.

== Books ==
- How To Get On the Fastrack In a Buncha Easy Lessons (1985)
- On The Mommy Track (1991)
- The Fastrack Annual Report (2000)
- Tomb Raiding for Fun and Profit (2000)
- The Best Christmas Ever (2000)
- Surviving Y2K – Outlast, Outwit, Outsource (2001)
- Spore 2.0 (2002)
- New Hair Day (2008)
- Merger! (2009)
- Bug Zapper (2010)
- iPetina (2011)
- Dethany: The Corporate Goth (2011)
- Dethany Exhumed! (2012)
- Bailout (2013)
- Freshly Dethany (2013)
- Cryptwarming (2014)
- Dethany's Raven (2015)
- 9 to 5 Goth (2016)
- Invasion of the Goth (2018)
- Autocorrect (2018)
- Dethany The Office Goth (2020)
- Dethany and the Other Clique (2021)
