= King Features Syndicate =

American print syndication company

King Features Syndicate, Inc.
- Logo used since 2016
- Type: Subsidiary
- Industry: Animation; Print syndication
- Founded: 1914; 112 years ago
- Founders: William Randolph Hearst; Moses Koenigsberg
- Headquarters: New York City, New York, U.S.
- Products: Comic strips, newspaper columns, editorial cartoons
- Parent: Hearst Communications
- Subsidiaries: North America Syndicate; Cowles Syndicate
- Website: kingfeatures.com

King Features Syndicate, Inc. is an American content distribution and animation studio, consumer product licensing and print syndication company owned by Hearst Communications that distributes about 150 comic strips, newspaper columns, editorial cartoons, puzzles, and games to nearly 5,000 newspapers worldwide. King Features Syndicate also produces intellectual properties, develops new content and franchises (like The Cuphead Show!, which it produced with Netflix), and licenses its classic characters and properties.

King Features Syndicate is a unit of Hearst Holdings, Inc., which combines the Hearst Corporation's cable-network partnerships, television programming, distribution activities, and syndication companies. King Features' affiliate syndicates are North America Syndicate and Cowles Syndicate.

== History ==
Historic logo, used until the 1960s

William Randolph Hearst's newspapers began syndicating material in 1895 after receiving requests from other newspapers. The first official Hearst syndicate was called Newspaper Feature Service, Inc., established in 1913. In 1914, Hearst and his manager Moses Koenigsberg consolidated all of Hearst's syndication enterprises under one banner (although Newspaper Feature Service was still in operation into at least the 1930s). Koenigsberg gave it his own name (the German word König means king) when he launched King Features Syndicate on November 16, 1915.

Production escalated in 1916 with King Features buying and selling its own staff-created feature material. A trade publication — Circulation — was published by King Features between 1916 and 1933. In January 1929, the world-famous Popeye character was introduced in King Features' Thimble Theater comic strip.

King Features had a series of hits during the 1930s with the launch of Blondie (1930–present), Flash Gordon (1934–2003 Note: Relaunched again in October 2023 by Dan Schkade as a daily and Sunday strip), Mandrake the Magician (1934–2013), and The Phantom (1936–present). In March 1936, a fictional, magical animal called Eugene the Jeep was added to Popeye, and trademarked.

King Features remained a "powerhouse" syndicate throughout the 1950s and the 1960s. In 1965 it launched a children's comic and coloring page.

In 1986, King Features acquired the Register and Tribune Syndicate for $4.3 million. Later that year, Hearst bought News America Syndicate (formerly Publishers-Hall). By this point, with both King Features and News America (renamed North America Syndicate), Hearst led all syndication services with 316 features.

In 2007, King Features donated its collection of comic-strip proof sheets (two sets of over 60 years' accumulation) to the Billy Ireland Cartoon Library & Museum and the Michigan State University Comic Art Collection while retaining the collection in electronic form for reference purposes.

In November 2015, King Features released a book, titled "King of the Comics: One Hundred Years of King Features Syndicate" to commemorate its 100th anniversary. The book features a compilation of strips and the histories behind King Features strips.

As of 2016, with 62 strips being syndicated, Hearst was considered the second-largest comics service, second only to Uclick (now known as Andrews McMeel Syndication).

In December 2017, King Features appointed CJ Kettler as president of the company. Kettler previously was CEO of Sunbow Entertainment and the executive producer of the Netflix series Carmen Sandiego.

== William Randolph Hearst's involvement ==
In 1941, King Features manager Moses Koenigsberg wrote an autobiographical history of the company titled King News. William Randolph Hearst paid close attention to the comic strips, even in the last years of his life, as is evident in these 1945–46 correspondence excerpts, originally in Editor & Publisher (December 1946), about the creation of Dick's Adventures in Dreamland — a strip that made its debut on Sunday, January 12, 1947; written by former Daily News reporter Max Trell and illustrated by Neil O'Keefe (who also drew for King Features a strip based on Edgar Wallace's Inspector Wade of Scotland Yard):

Hearst to King Features president J. D. Gortatowsky (December 28, 1945): "I have had numerous suggestions for incorporating some American history of a vivid kind in the adventure strips of the comic section. The difficulty is to find something that will sufficiently interest the kids… Perhaps a title — "Trained by Fate" — would be general enough. Take Paul Revere and show him as a boy making as much of his boyhood life as possible, and culminate, of course, with his ride. Take Betsy Ross for a heroine, or Barbara Fritchie… for the girls."

King Features editor Ward Greene to Hearst: "There is another way to do it, which is somewhat fantastic, but which I submit for your consideration. That is to devise a new comic… a dream idea revolving around a boy we might call Dick. Dick, or his equivalent, would go in his dream with Mad Anthony Wayne at the storming of Stony Point or with Decatur at Tripoli… [This would] provide a constant character… who would become known to the kids."

Hearst to Greene: "The dream idea for the American history series is splendid. It gives continuity and personal interest, and you can make more than one page of each series… You are right about the importance of the artist."

Greene to Hearst (enclosing samples): "We employed the dream device, building the comic around a small boy."

Hearst: "I think the drawing of Dick and His Dad is amazingly good. It is perfectly splendid. I am afraid, however, that similar beginning and conclusion of each page might give a deadly sameness to the series… Perhaps we could get the dream idea over by having only the conclusion on each page. I mean, do not show the boy going to sleep every time and then show him waking up, but let the waking up come as a termination to each page… Can you develop anything out of the idea of having Dick the son of the keeper of the Liberty Statue in New York Harbor? I do not suggest this, as it would probably add further complications, but it might give a spiritual tie to all the dreams. The main thing, however, is to get more realism."

Greene: "We do not have to show the dream at the beginning and end of every page… If we simply call the comic something like Dreamer Dick, we would have more freedom… Some device other than the dream might be used… A simple method would be to have him curl up with a history book."

Hearst: "If we find [the first series] is not a success, of course we can brief it, but if it is a success it should be a long series."

Greene: "I am sending you two sample pages of Dick's Adventures in Dreamland which start a series about Christopher Columbus."

Hearst: "In January, I am told, we are going to 16 pages regularly on Puck, the Comic Weekly. That would be a good time to introduce the Columbus series, don't you think so?"

The last strips Hearst personally selected for syndication were Elliot Caplin & John Cullen Murphy's Big Ben Bolt and Mort Walker's Beetle Bailey; Hearst died in 1951.

== Editors ==
In the 1940s, Ward Greene (1893–1956) was King Features' editor, having worked his way up through the ranks. He was a reporter and war correspondent for the Atlanta Journal for four years (1913–17), moving to the New-York Tribune in 1917 and then returning to the Atlanta Journal as correspondent in France and Germany (1918–19). He joined King Features in 1920, became a writer and editor of the magazine section in 1925, advancing to executive editor and general manager.

Vice president Bradley Kelly (1894–1969) was a comics editor during the 1940s.

Sylvan Byck (1904–1982) was head editor of the syndicate's comics features for several decades, from the 1950s until his retirement in 1978. A King Features employee for more than 40 years and comics editor for 33 years, Byck was 78 when he died July 8, 1982. Comic-strip artist John Celardo (1918–2012) began as a King comics editor in 1973.

In 1973, Tom Pritchard (1928–1992) joined King Features, and became executive editor in 1990, overseeing daily editorial operations and the development of political cartoons, syndicated columns, and editorial services for King Features and North America Syndicate. Born in Bronxville, New York, Pritchard arrived at King Features after work as a reporter at The Record-Journal (Meriden, Connecticut), as feature writer with The Hartford Times, as editor-publisher of Connecticut's weekly Wethersfield Post, and as executive editor of The Manchester Journal Inquirer in Connecticut. He died of a heart attack in December 1992 at his home in Norwalk.

In 1978, cartoonist Bill Yates (1921–2001) took over as King Features' comics editor. He had previously edited Dell Publishing's cartoon magazines (1000 Jokes, Ballyhoo, For Laughing Out Loud) and Dell's paperback cartoon collections. Yates resigned from King Features at the end of 1988 to spend full-time on his cartooning, and he died March 26, 2001.

In 1988, Yates was replaced by Jay Kennedy — author of The Official Underground & Newave Comix Price Guide (Norton Boatner, 1982). Kennedy was King Features' lead editor until March 15, 2007, when he drowned in a riptide while vacationing in Costa Rica.

Brendan Burford, who attended the School of Visual Arts, was employed for a year as an editorial assistant at DC Comics before joining King Features as an editorial assistant in January 2000. Working closely with Jay Kennedy over a seven-year span, he was promoted to associate editor and then, after Kennedy's death, to the position of comics editor on April 23, 2007.

In November 2018, Tea Fougner was promoted to editorial director for comics after working as an editor at King Features for nine years. She is the first female-assigned and first genderqueer person to oversee comics editorial at King Features.

=== Comics editors ===
- 1940s: Bradley Kelly
- 1946–1956: Ward Greene
- 1956–1978: Sylvan Byck
- 1978–1988: Bill Yates
- 1988–2007: Jay Kennedy
- 2007–2017: Brendan Burford
- 2018–Present: Tea Fougner

== Strip submissions ==
When asked to speak in public, Byck made a point of telling audiences that King Features received more than 1,000 strip proposals annually, but chose only one each year. However, in Syd Hoff's The Art of Cartooning (Stravon, 1973), Byck offered some tips regarding strip submissions, including the creation of central characters with warmth and charm and the avoidance of "themes that are too confining," as he explained:

Although characterization is the most important element of a comic, the cartoonist also must cope with the problem of choosing a theme for his new strip. What will it be about? Actually, it is possible to do a successful comic strip about almost anything or anybody if the writing and drawing are exactly right for the chosen subject. In general, though, it is best to stay away from themes that are too confining. If you achieve your goal of syndication, you want your strip to last a long time. You don't want to run out of ideas after a few weeks or months. In humor strips, it is better to build around a character than around a job. For example, it is possible to do some very funny comic strip gags about a taxi driver. But a strip that is limited to taxi driver gags is bound to wear thin pretty fast. I'd rather see a strip about a warmly funny man who just happens to earn his living as a cabbie and whose job is only a minor facet of his potential for inspiring gags. Narrative strips can be and often are based on the central character's job. For example, the basis of a private eye strip is the work he does. But even here the strip will only be as successful as the characterization in it. The big question is: what kind of a man is this particular private eye?

== Content distribution ==
King Features Syndicate's content distribution division distributes more than 150 different comics, games, puzzles, and columns, in digital and print formats, to nearly 5,000 daily, Sunday, weekly and online newspapers and other publishers. Comic properties include Beetle Bailey, Blondie, Dennis the Menace, The Family Circus, Curtis, Rhymes with Orange, Arctic Circle, Macanudo, and Zits. The division additionally offers services for smaller publishers and community papers, including pagination and colorization services through its sister company, RBMA.

In March 2018, to mark International Women's Day, many King Features cartoonists included messages about female empowerment and other topics that resonated with them.

In April 2020, Bianca Xunise became the first black woman to join the team of female creators behind King Features strip Six Chix. Six Chix was first syndicated by King Features in May 2019, after King Features saw strip creator Maritsa Patrinos' work online.

In June 2020, King Features started syndicating webcomic Rae the Doe. In the same month, cartoonists from King Features, along with artists from Kirkman's, Andrews McMeel Syndication and National Cartoonists Society, hid symbols in their Sunday strips as a tribute to essential workers during the COVID-19 pandemic.

In September 2020, King Features relaunched comic strip Mark Trail, originally launched in 1946, with cartoonist Jules Rivera, author of comic strip Love, Joolz, at the helm.

== Animation, comic books, and licensing ==
Many King characters were adapted to animation, both theatrical and television cartoons. Strips from King Features were often reprinted by comic book publishers. In 1967, King Features made an effort to publish comic books of its own by establishing King Comics. This short-lived comic-book line showcased King's best-known characters in seven titles:

- Beetle Bailey
- Blondie
- Flash Gordon
- Jungle Jim
- Mandrake the Magician
- The Phantom
- Popeye

The comics imprint existed for a year and a half, with titles cover-dated from August 1966 to December 1967. When it ended, the books were picked up and continued by Gold Key Comics, Harvey Comics, and Charlton Comics.

In 1967, Al Brodax, then the president of King Features, pitched The Beatles manager Brian Epstein on turning their hit song "Yellow Submarine" into an animated movie. The film was widely considered to be the first animated film for adult audiences, despite its G-rating in United States.

In addition to extensive merchandising and licensing of such iconic characters as Betty Boop, Felix the Cat, and Popeye, King Features has diversified to handle popular animation and TV characters (from "Kukla, Fran and Ollie" and "Howdy Doody" to "Mr. Bill" and "Mr. Magoo"), plus publicly displayed, life-sized art sculptures — "CowParade", "Guitarmania" and "The Trail of the Painted Ponies." King Features also represents David and Goliath, an apparel and accessories line popular with teenagers.

King Features additionally licenses outdoor apparel brand PURENorway, Moomins, Icelandic lifestyle brand Tulipop, ringtone character Crazy Frog and South Korean animated character PUCCA.

As a sales tool, the King Features design team created colorful strip sample folders resembling movie press kits. With rising paper costs and the downsizing of newspapers, the comic-strip arena became increasingly competitive, and by 2002, King salespeople were making in-person pitches to 1,550 daily newspapers across America. King was then receiving more than 6,000 strip submissions each year, yet it accepted only two or three annually. Interviewed in 2002 by Catherine Donaldson-Evans of Fox News, Kennedy commented:

It is difficult for cartoonists to break into syndication, but contrary to popular understanding, there's more new product being pitched now than 30 years ago. In that regard, there are more opportunities for new cartoonists. There's a finite amount of space to run comic strips—less now than 50 years ago. There are fewer two-paper cities and a lot of papers have shrunk their page size. New strips can succeed. The new cartoonists just have to be that much better.

One of the first original animation projects of King Features Animation is The Cuphead Show! for Netflix, an animated series based on the video game Cuphead by Studio MDHR, known for its use of fully hand-drawn characters and animations in the style of Fleischer Studios. The series had started development since July 2019, and was released on February 18, 2022.

In June 2019, 20th Century Studios and The Walt Disney Company announced the production of an animated film based on the comic strip Flash Gordon. Taiki Waititi was attached to direct and John Davis was announced as the producer.

On May 11, 2020, it was announced that a Popeye movie is in development at King Features Syndicate with Genndy Tartakovsky coming back to the project.

In November 2020, a Hagar the Horrible animated series was announced, written by Eric Zibroski, who wrote and produced the ABC comedy Fresh Off the Boat.

== Digital platforms ==
=== DailyINK (2006–2013) ===
Confronted by newspaper cutbacks, King Features has explored new venues, such as placing comic strips on mobile phones. In 2006, it launched DailyINK. On a web page and via email, the DailyINK service made available more than 90 vintage and current comic strips, puzzles, and editorial cartoons. The vintage strips included Bringing Up Father, Buz Sawyer, Flash Gordon, Krazy Kat, The Little King, The Phantom, and Rip Kirby. King Features editor-in-chief Jay Kennedy introduced the service early in 2006, commenting:

Comics are consistently ranked among the most popular sections by newspaper readers. However, because of space, newspapers are not able to offer as vast a selection as many readers would like, and therefore millions of comic lovers are often not exposed to some of the most creative strips. In creating DailyINK, we wanted to ensure that fans had a destination where they could experience our complete lineup of award-winning comic artists and writers. DailyINK really sets the standard for comics online. By offering all of our current favorites updated daily, along with access to our archives of beloved characters as well as political humor and games, we have designed DailyINK.com as a destination fans will want to visit every day for something new.

With 11,000 subscribers by June 2010, more vintage strips were added to DailyINK, including Barney Google, Beetle Bailey, Big Ben Bolt, Brick Bradford, The Heart of Juliet Jones, Jackys Diary, The Katzenjammer Kids, Little Iodine, Mandrake the Magician, Office Hours, Quincy and Radio Patrol. On November 15, 2010, a subscription rate increase to $19.99 was announced, effective December 15, 2010, with applications available on iPhone, iPad, and iPod Touch, plus a "new and improved" DailyINK in 2011. The redesign was by Blenderbox. Added features included original publication dates, a forum, and a blog, mostly promotional, but also with "Ask the Archivist" posts exploring comic-strip history. The "Last 7" feature enables the reader to see a week's worth of comics on one page.

On January 13, 2012, the DailyINK app was voted as the People's Champ in the Funny category in the 2011 Pixel Awards. Established in 2006, the Pixel Awards honor sites and apps displaying excellence in web design and development. Other nominees in the Funny category: JibJab Media Inc, Threaded, Snowball of Duty: White Opps and SoBe Staring Contest.

In 2012, Jackys Diary was dropped from DailyINK, and the Archivist explained: "Unfortunately, we no longer have the rights to publish the strip."

In December 2013, Daily INK was relaunched as part of King Feature's Comics Kingdom.

=== Comics Kingdom (2008–present) ===
In November 2008, King Features introduced Comics Kingdom, a digital platform that newspapers can embed on their sites. Comics Kingdom splits advertising revenue with newspapers carrying the feature; those papers make local sales, while King handles national sales. During the 30-day period in which strips are made available on the newspaper sites, readers can post comments on local community forums.

In January 2019, to commemorate Popeye's 90th birthday, multiple King Features cartoonists drew their own versions of the comic and published those strips on Comics Kingdom. One comic included the cast of Netflix's Queer Eye giving Popeye a makeover.

In November 2019, Comics Kingdom launched a YouTube channel featuring classic cartoons from King Features archives. Before launching the channel, in December 2018, King Features launched a series of animated Popeye shorts to its primary YouTube channel, in celebration of the character's 90th "birthday."

In July 2020, comic strip Rhymes with Orange launched a virtual interactive comic with digital drawing company Mental Canvas on Comics Kingdom.

As of January 2022, Comics Kingdom features comic strips and editorial cartoons which can be accessed and read online. This website also features some interactive puzzles. Comics are updated every day, plus a one-year archive is available. Older comics can be accessed by being a Comics Kingdom Royal (a paid member, subscribed to their premium subscription service). Comics Kingdom also features over 30 of comic strips in Spanish.

=== A la Carte Online Comics ===
King's A la Carte Online Comics offers syndication of specific strips aimed at "precisely defined audiences" of specialized websites. These are available in such categories as Animals, Environmental, Military, and Technology.

=== King Features Weekly Planet ===
King Features Weekly Planet was created as an online newspaper of King's columns, comics, and puzzles.

== King Features strips and panels ==
=== Current strips ===
- Alice by Andrea E. Beizer
- Arctic Circle by Alex Hallatt
- Barney Google and Snuffy Smith by Billy DeBeck, Fred Lasswell and John Rose (began 1919)
- Beetle Bailey by Mort Walker, currently by Greg, Neal and Brian Walker (began 1950)
- Between Friends by Sandra Bell-Lundy (began 1990, became syndicated in 1994)
- Beware of Toddler by George Gant
- Bizarro by Dan Piraro and Wayno (began 1985)
- Break of Day by Nate Fakes
- Blondie by Chic Young, currently by Dean Young and John Marshall (began 1930)
- The Brilliant Mind of Edison Lee by John Hambrock
- Carpe Diem by Niklas Eriksson
- Curtis by Ray Billingsley
- Daddy Day Daze by Jon Kovaleski
- Dennis the Menace by Hank Ketcham, currently by Scott Ketcham, Marcus Hamilton and Ron Ferdinand (began 1951, moved from News America Syndicate in 1986)
- Dustin by Steve Kelley and Jeff Parker (began 2010)
- Dumplings by Victor van Acker
- The Family Circus by Bil Keane, currently by Jeff Keane (began 1960, moved from Register and Tribune Syndicate in 1986)
- Flash Gordon by Alex Raymond, currently by Dan Schkade (original run 1934—2003, relaunched in 2023)
- Gearhead Gertie by Mike Smith
- Hägar the Horrible by Dik Browne (began 1973)
- Hi and Lois by Mort Walker and Dik Browne, currently by Brian Walker and Eric Reaves (began 1954)
- Hocus-Focus
- Insanity Streak by Tony Lopes
- Intelligent Life by David Reddick
- Judge Parker by Francesco Marciuliano and Mike Manley (began 1952)
- Kevin and Kell by Bill Holbrook (online only)
- Legalization Nation by Box Brown
- Legend of Bill by David Reddick
- Macanudo by Liniers (began 2002, syndicated in the North American market since 2016)
- Mallard Fillmore by Brad Tinsley and Loren Fishman (began 1994)
- Mara Llave: Keeper of Time by Alex Segura and Nickole J. Villiger
- Mark Trail
- Marvin by Tom Armstrong (began 1982)
- Mary Worth (began 1938)
- Mother Goose and Grimm by Mike Peters (began 1984)
- Mutts by Patrick McDonnell (began 1994)
- Never Been Deader by Tommy De Void
- Olive and Popeye by Erm Burdge and Randy Milholland
- On the Fastrack by Bill Holbrook (began 1984)
- Pardon My Planet by Vic Lee
- The Phantom by Lee Falk, currently by Tony DePaul, Mike Manley and Jeff Weigel (began 1936)
- Popeye by Segar, currently by Randy Milholland (began 1919 as Thimble Theatre, dailies in reruns)
- Prince Valiant by Hal Foster, currently by Thomas Yeates and Jeff Schultz (began 1937)
- Rae the Doe by Olive Brinker
- Rex Morgan, M.D. (began 1948)
- Rhymes with Orange by Hillary Price and Rina Piccolo (began 1995)
- Rosebuds by Deon "Supr Dee" Parson
- Safe Havens by Bill Holbrook (began 1988)
- Sally Forth
- Shoe by Jeff McNelly, currently by Ben Lansing (began 1977, moved from Tribune Publishing Service in 2016)
- Six Chix (began 2000)
- Slylock Fox & Comics for Kids by Bob Weber, currently by Bob Weber, Jr. and Scott "Diggs" Underwood.
- Take it from the Tinkersons by Bill Bettwy (began 2014)
- Todd the Dinosaur (began 2004)
- Tundra by Chad Carpenter (international sales only)
- Zippy the Pinhead by Bill Griffith (began 1976, ran as a self-syndicated alternative comic until 1986)
- Zits by Jerry Scott and Jim Borgman (began 1997)

=== Former strips ===
- Archie by Bob Montana, Stan Goldberg, Dan De Carlo, Greg Scarpelli and Craig Boldman (1946—2011, moved from McClure Syndicate in c. 1955 and moved in c. 1995 to Creators Syndicate, currently in reruns)
- Abie the Agent by Harry Hershfield (1915—1931, 1935—1939)
- The Amazing Spider-Man by Stan Lee (1977—2019, in reruns until 2023)
- Apartment 3-G (1961—2015, moved from News America Syndicate in 1986)
- Baby Blues by Jerry Scott and Rick Kirkman (1990—present, moved from Creators Syndicate in 1995 and moved in 2023 to Andrews-McMeel Syndicate)
- The Better Half
- Betty Boop by Max Fleischer, drawn by Roland Crandall and other artists (1934—1938)
- Betty Boop and Felix by Mort Walker (1984—1988)
- Big Ben Bolt by Eliot Caplin and John Cullen Murphy (1950—1978)
- Bleeker: The Rechargeable Dog
- Boner's Ark by Mort Walker (1968—2000)
- Boob McNutt by Rube Goldberg (1915—1934)
- Brick Bradford
- Bringing Up Father by George McManus, Vernon Greene and Frank Johnson (1913—2000, currently in reruns)
- Buckles
- Buz Sawyer
- Candorville by Darrin Bell (discontinued 2025)
- The Cisco Kid
- Crankshaft
- Crock
- Deflocked
- Dick, el Artillero by José Luis Salinas (Dick the Striker, Argentine strip, distributed in Latin America only)
- Donald Duck by Walt Disney, drawn by Al Taliaferro and other artists (1938—1994, moved to Creators Syndicate in 1990, in reruns until 2014)*
- Doraemon by Fujiko Fujio (1969 – 1997, Asia only)*
- Dumb Dora by Chic Young, Paul Fung and Bil Dwyer (1924—1936)
- Edge City by Terry and Patty Laban (currently in reruns)
- Elmer by Doc Winner (1918—1956)
- Etta Kett (1925—1974)
- Felix the Cat by Pat Sullivan, drawn by Otto Messmer and other artists (1923—1964)
- Flapper Filosofy
- Franklin Fibbs
- Freddie the Sheik by Jack Callahan (1922—1929)
- Funky Winkerbean by Tom Batiuk (1972—2022)
- Gil by Norm Feuti
- Grin and Bear It (ended May 2015)
- Happy Hooligan by Frederick Burr Opper (1900—1932)
- The Heart of Juliet Jones by Stan Drake
- Hazel by Ted Key
- Henry by Carl Anderson and Don Trachte (1935—1995, in reruns until 2018)
- Hubert by Dick Wingert
- Inside Woody Allen (1976—1984)
- Jerry on the Job by Walter Hoban (1913—1931, second run by Bob Naylor 1946—1949)
- Johnny Hazard
- José Carioca by Walt Disney
- Jungle Jim by Alex Raymond (1934—1954)
- The Katzenjammer Kids by Rudolph Dirks, Harold Knerr, Doc Winner, Joe Musial, Angelo DeCesare and Hy Eisman (1897—2006, currently in reruns)
- Krazy Kat by George Herriman (1913—1944)
- Laff-a-Day
- Little Annie Rooney by Ed Verdier, Ben Batsford, Brandon Walsh, Darrell MacClure and Nicholas Afonsky (1927—1966)
- Little Audrey by Joe Oriolo and other artists
- Little Iodine by Jimmy Hatlo
- The Little King by Otto Soglow (1933—1975)
- Mandrake the Magician by Lee Falk and Fred Fredericks (1934—2006)
- Merry Menagerie by Walt Disney (1947—1962)
- Mickey Mouse by Walt Disney, drawn by Floyd Gottfredson and other artists (1930—1994, moved in 1990 to Creators Syndicate, in reruns until 2014)
- Moose & Molly by Bob Weber (currently in reruns)
- Mr. Abernathy by Frank Ridgeway and Ralston Jones
- My Cage
- Norb
- The Norm
- Oh, Brother!
- Ollie and Quentin (2002—2011, began syndication in 2008, reruns from January 9, 2012 to c. 2016)
- Ozark Ike
- The Pajama Diaries by Terry Libenson (currently in reruns)
- Pete the Tramp
- Piranha Club by Ernie Freeman (1988—2014, originally titled Ernie)
- Polly and Her Pals by Cliff Sterrett (1912—1958)
- Quincy (1970—1978)
- Radio Patrol by Will Gould (1934—1938)
- Red Barry
- Redeye
- Retail by Norm Feuti (2006—2020)
- Rip Kirby (1946—1999)
- Ripley's Believe It or Not! by various artists (1918—present, began syndication in 1929 and moved in 1989 to United Feature Syndicate)
- Room and Board by Gene Ahern (1936—1958)
- Rusty Riley
- Sam and Silo by Mort Walker and Jerry Dumas (original run 1962—1964 as Sam's Strip, revived run 1977—2017, currently in reruns)
- Secret Agent X-9
- Sherman's Lagoon by Jim Toomey (1991—present, self-syndicated until 1992 and moved in 2022 to Andrews-McMeel Syndicate)
- Skippy by Percy L. Crosby (1925—1945)
- Steve Roper and Mike Nomad (1936—2004, originally Big Chief Wahoo)
- Teena
- They'll Do It Every Time by Jimmy Hatlo
- Tiger by Bud Blake (1965—2005, currently in reruns)
- Tillie the Toiler by Russ Westover and Bob Gustafson (1921—1959)
- Tim Tyler's Luck by Lyman Young
- Tina's Groove by Rina Piccolo (currently in reruns)
- Toots and Casper by Jimmy Murphy (1918—1956)
- Triple Take by Todd Clark and Scott Nickel (2005—2007)
- Trudy by Dick Wingert
- Tumbleweeds by Tom K. Ryan (1969—2001)
- Walt Disney's Treasury of Classic Tales by various artists (1950—1994, moved in 1990 to Creators Syndicate, reruns until 1997)
- Zane Grey's King of the Royal Mounted by Romer Grey, Stephen Slesinger, Gaylord DuBois, Allen Dean, Charles Flanders and Jim Gary (1935—1954)

== Editorial cartoonists ==
- Jim Borgman
- Ed Gamble
- Alex Hallatt
- Jeff Koterba
- Jimmy Margulies
- Jim Morin
- Mike Peters
- Mike Shelton
- Darrin Bell

== Columnists ==
=== Commentary ===
- Stanley Crouch
- Amy Goodman, "Breaking the Sound Barrier"
- David Hackworth, "Defending America"
- Roger Hernandez
- Rich Lowry
- Marianne Means
- Dan Rather
- Charley Reese
- Maria Elena Salinas

=== Lifestyle and advice ===
- Dana Block and Cindy Elavsky, "Daytime Dial"
- John Bonne et al., "The Wine Chronicle"
- Helen Bottel, "Helen Help Us!"
- Tad Burness, "Auto Album"
- Jack Canfield and Mark Victor Hansen, "Chicken Soup for the Soul"
- Al and Kelly Carell, "Super Handyman"
- Harlan Cohen, "Help Me, Harlan!"
- Vicki Farmer Ellis, "Sew Simple"
- Arthur Frommer, "Arthur Frommer's Travel Column"
- Peggy Gisler and Marge Eberts, "Dear Teacher"
- Heloise, "Hints from Heloise"
- Ken Hoffman, "The Drive-Thru Gourmet"
- Rheta Grimsley Johnson
- Jeanne Jones, "Cook It Light"
- Ralph and Terry Kovel, "Kovels: Antiques and Collecting"
- Tom and Ray Magliozzi from Car Talk, "Click and Clack Talk Cars"
- Tom McMahon, "Kid Tips: Practical Solutions for Everyday Parenting"
- Seventeen, "Dear Seventeen"
- Debbie Travis, "House to Home"
- Barbara Wallraff from Atlantic Monthly, "Word Court"
- Allan Wernick, "Immigration and Citizenship"
- Terry Stickels, "Wit and Wisdom", "Stickelers" column
- Phil Erwin, "The Card Corner"
- Eric Tyson, "Investors' Guide

=== Affiliated syndicates ===
- Torstar Syndication Services (King's distribution partner in Canada)

== See also ==
- List of newspaper comic strips
- List of comic strip syndicates
- National Comics Publications
