= Langley High School (Fairfax County, Virginia) =

Public high school in McLean, Virginia

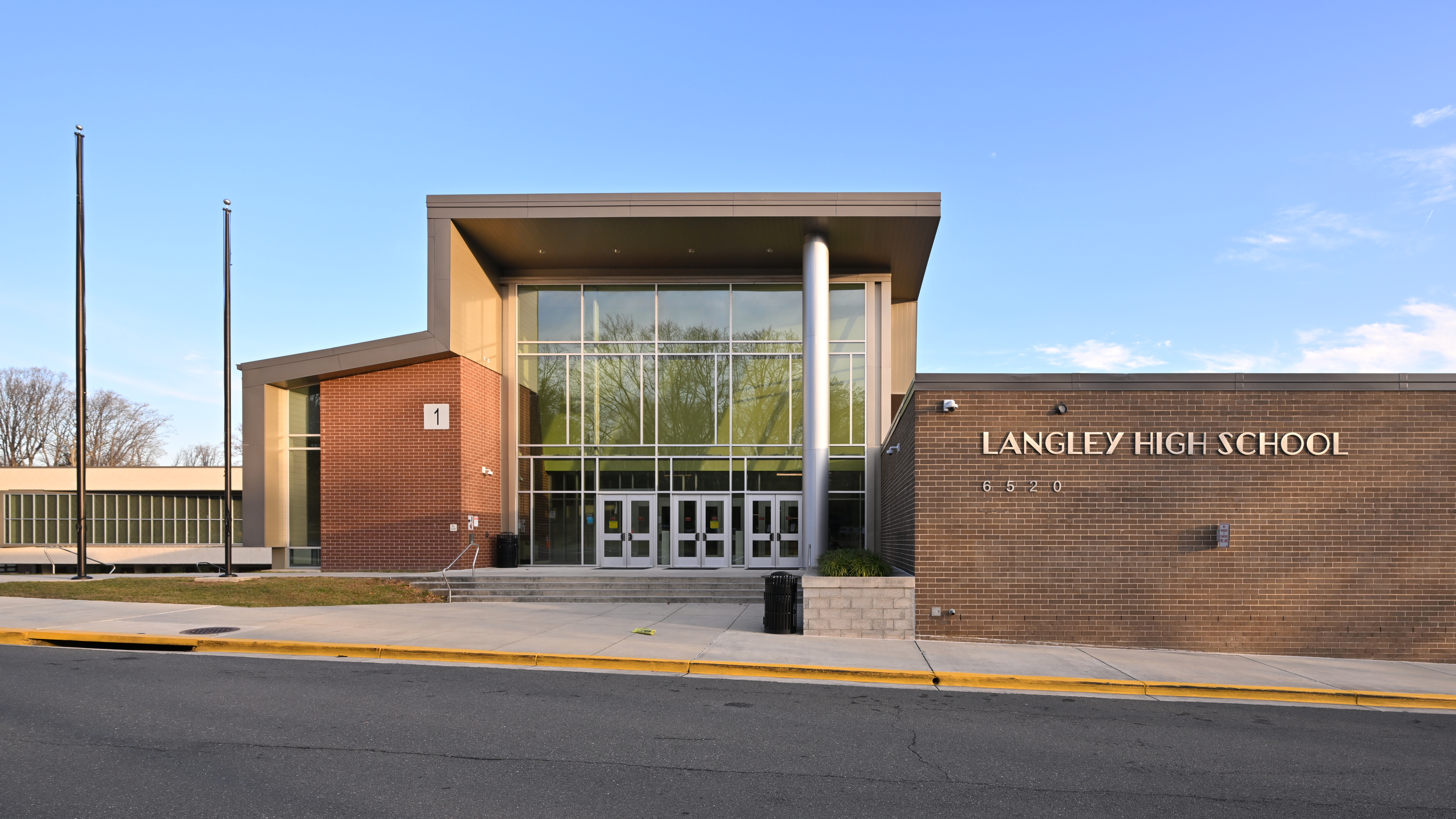
- Langley High School in December 2023

Location
- 6520 Georgetown Pike; McLean, Fairfax, Virginia 22101; United States; 38°57′N 77°10′W

Information
- Type: Public secondary
- Established: 1965
- School district: Fairfax County Public Schools
- NCES District ID: 5101260
- Educational authority: Virginia Department of Education
- School code: VA-029-0291460
- CEEB code: 471393
- NCES School ID: 510126000517
- Principal: Lawrence Stroud
- Teaching staff: 115.70 (on an FTE basis)
- Grades: 9–12
- Enrollment: 2,049 (2021-2022)
  - Grade 9: 533
  - Grade 10: 505
  - Grade 11: 521
  - Grade 12: 490
- Student to teacher ratio: 17.71:1
- Campus type: Suburban
- Colors: Green and Gold
- Athletics conference: Liberty District; Class 6A Region D
- Mascot: Otto the Saxon
- Nickname: Saxons
- USNWR ranking: 136
- SAT average: 1851
- Feeder schools: Cooper Middle School
- Website: langleyhs.fcps.edu

Langley High School (Region 1, grades 9–12), is a public high school within the Fairfax County Public Schools in McLean, Virginia, United States.

== History ==
Established in 1965, Langley High School was named for Thomas Lee's British estate "Langley Manor". Thomas Lee was one of the first to envision the Thirteen Colonies as a separate nation whose capital should be on the Potomac between Great Falls and Little Falls. Keeping these things in mind, the school steering committee chose the nickname 'Saxons' and the school's colors of forest green and old gold with white as a trim color in keeping with the traditional theme."

== Admissions ==
Langley's boundaries extend west of State Route 123 (Dolley Madison Boulevard) and north of both State Route 7 (Leesburg Pike) and State Route 267 (Dulles Toll Road) from McLean to Great Falls, ending at the Loudoun County line. Small parts of Vienna, Reston, and Herndon along the south side of Route 7 are also within the school's attendance area.

Until 1994, areas west of Springvale Road in Great Falls were within the Herndon High School boundaries. After leaving Forestville Elementary School, students attended Herndon Middle and Herndon High School. When Buzz Aldrin Elementary School was preparing to open, Langley High School was then under-enrolled; some residents from the Forestville attendance area requested reassignment of their neighborhoods from the Herndon High to the Langley High School pyramid. As a result, school officials shifted Langley's boundary line west from Springvale Road to the Loudoun County border.

=== Demographics ===
Enrollment by Race/Ethnicity 2021–2022
| White | Asian | Two or More Races | Hispanic | Black | American Indian/Alaska Native | Native Hawaiian/Pacific Islander |
|---|---|---|---|---|---|---|
| 1,151 | 561 | 153 | 146 | 32 | 5 | 1 |

Enrollment by Race/Ethnicity 2025–2026
| White | Asian | Hispanic | Black | Other |
|---|---|---|---|---|
| 1,062 | 703 | 149 | 57 | 185 |
| 49.12% | 32.79% | 6.89% | 2.64% | 8.56% |

The student body was 69.50% White, 20.87% Asian, 4.59% Hispanic, 1.18% Black, and 3.86% Other during the 2012–13 academic school year. In the 2011–12 school year, Langley High School's student body was 71.15% White, 19.20% Asian, 4.60% Hispanic, 1.70% Black and 3.35% Other.

== Curriculum ==
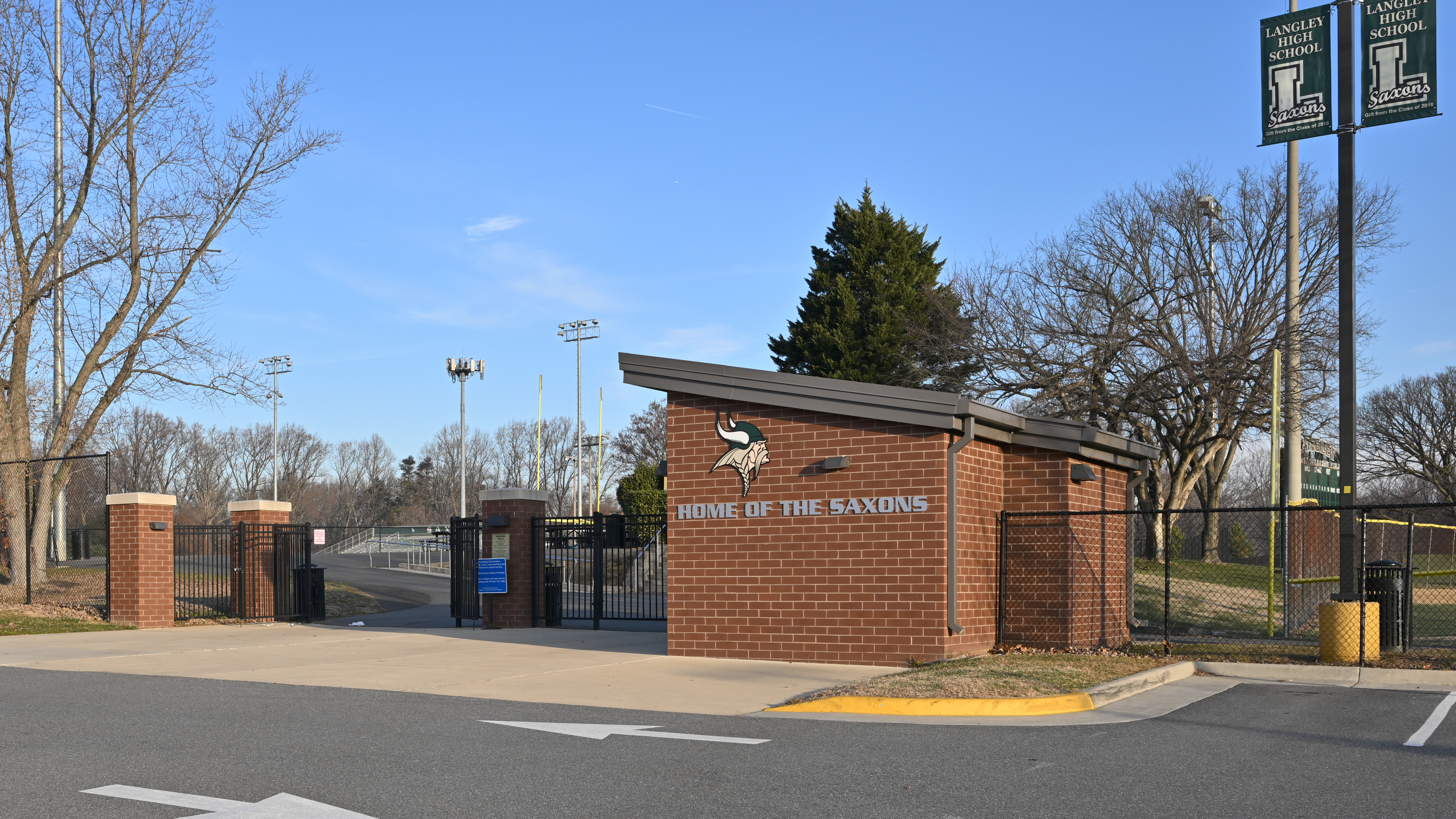
Entrance to the Langley Stadium.

The LHS academic program follows standard Virginia guidelines, requiring 24 credits for graduation. Additionally provided at Langley is the Advanced Placement (AP) program. Langley offers one of the most comprehensive AP programs available, featuring more than 20 AP-level classes in every discipline. The school offers Multivariable Calculus and Linear Algebra classes. Along with Thomas Jefferson High School for Science and Technology, it is one of only two high schools in the Fairfax County Public High School system to offer courses in Russian.

In 2021, U.S. News & World Report ranked Langley High School the second-best high school in Virginia, behind Thomas Jefferson High School for Science and Technology and 156th nationally.

== Extracurricular activities ==
=== Relay For Life of Langley-McLean ===
Since 2013, Langley High School has hosted the American Cancer Society's Relay For Life of Langley-McLean, an overnight fundraising event and one of only two student-led Relay For Life fundraisers held in Virginia.

=== Model United Nations ===
Langley High School has a nationally competitive Model United Nations team.

=== South Asian Student Association ===
The school had an active South Asian Student Association (SASA), which holds an annual "International Night". In 2014, Langley SASA hosted its first District-Wide charity event "Bollywood Bash". CHORD, the organization the association is raising money for, promotes literacy and strengthens local government in rural India.

=== Student publications ===
Langley's award-winning student news magazine is The Saxon Scope. Langley's yearbook is The Shire.

=== Music Department ===
Langley's music department consists of award-winning band, choral, and orchestral programs.

The band program comprises six bands: Percussion Ensemble, Symphonic Band, Wind Ensemble, Wind Symphony, Marching Band, and Jazz Band. Langley also has a marching band that performs at home football games and state marching band competitions, which is accompanied by the award-winning Color Guard team. The Langley Band performed in Spain in 2014, Chicago in 2015, and Los Angeles in 2016. The Wind Symphony performed in Indianapolis in 2017 at the prestigious Music For All National Festival. In 2018, it traveled to Italy, performing in cathedrals in Rome and Florence.

The choral program consists of five choirs: Treble, Women's Select, Concert, Chamber, and Madrigals. Langley Choirs have competed in competitions in Prague, Salzburg, and domestically in Orlando and San Diego.

The orchestral program consists of three orchestras: Symphonic, Sinfonietta, and Philharmonic.

=== Science Fair ===
Langley High School participates in science fair events. Each year, first and second-place winners from the school-hosted science fair are selected to attend the Fairfax County Science and Engineering Fair. The Fairfax County Science and Engineering Fair is an International Science and Engineering Fair (ISEF)-affiliated fair, sending around ten projects each year to the international fair. Notable winners from the past have included:

- (2009) Jun Sup Lee – 4th Place Grand Prize in Mathematics at the competition in Reno, Nevada.
- (2010) Jong Hyuck Won – Grand Prize Winner and Best of Category in Medicine and Health Sciences at the competition in San Jose, California.
- (2011) Kelly Martins – 3rd Place Grand Prize in Environmental Management at the competition in Los Angeles.
- (2012) Jason Cui – 4th Place Grand Prize in Medicine and Health Sciences at the competition in Pittsburgh, Pennsylvania.

=== Other activities ===
Langley's fashion department sponsors an annual fashion show in Langley's auditorium. Langley High School's Science Olympiad team has received many accolades at the state and national levels.

== Athletics ==
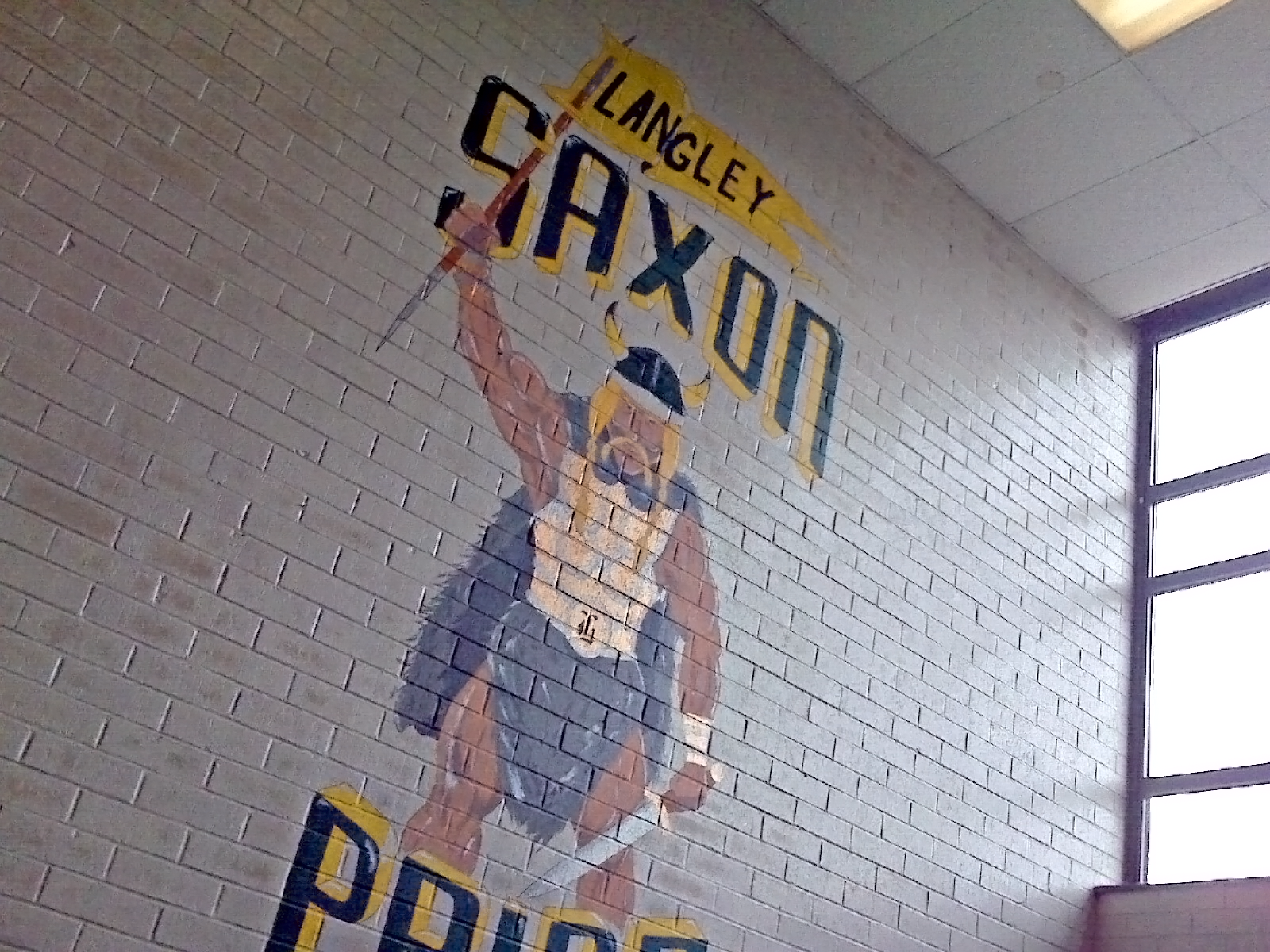
Langley's mascot is "Otto the Saxon."

Langley plays in the AAA Liberty District of the Northern Region. The Langley sports teams are all referred to as the "Saxons".

The football team won the Northern Region and went to the state finals in 1993.

Langley's varsity Ice Hockey team has won 4 NVSHL Virginia State Championships, 2019, 2022, 2023, 2024, and 2025. In addition, they have appeared in the NVSHL Playoff 14 consecutive times, 2009 - 2025. The team has also advanced on to the National Champions after their State wins for the past 3 years.

The boys' wrestling team won the Liberty District Tournament for 11 years straight (2001–2011). In addition, it was the Northern Region champion in 2007.

In 2009, 2010, and 2011, Langley's AAA boys' lacrosse team won the state championship.

The boys' swim and dive team won the VHSL State Championships in 2017–2018, their first State Victory in Langley's history.

The girls' tennis team won the Northern Region title in 2011, then went undefeated in 2012 to sweep the district, regional, and state titles.

Langley High School Boys' soccer team won its first Virginia State Championship in 2015, second in 2017, and third in 2022. At the end of the 2014–2015 soccer year, Langley's boys' varsity team held the rank of No. 4 in the country by soccer publication TopDrawerSoccer.com.

Langley High School's mascot is Otto the Saxon.

=== State championships ===
Langley has won 56 championships, which are:

- Girls Volleyball 2013, 2017
- Boys Lacrosse 2009, 2010, 2011, 2012
- Girls Tennis 1979, 1980, 1986, 1987, 1988, 1991, 1992, 2012, 2022, 2023, 2024
- Girls Swim and Dive 1998, 1999, 2000, 2001, 2011, 2015
- Boys Golf 1983, 1984, 2001, 2011, 2016, 2017, 2018, 2019, 2020, 2021, 2022, 2024
- Girls Gymnastics 2004
- Boys Tennis 1986, 1987, 1988, 1991, 1992, 1994, 2023, 2024
- Baseball 2025
- Softball 1992
- Girls Cross-Country 1983, 1984
- Boys Cross-Country 1979
- Scholastic Bowl 2014, 2015, 2016
- Boys Soccer 2015, 2017, 2022
- Boys Swim and Dive 2018, 2026
- Girls Lacrosse, 2019, 2021
- Field Hockey, 2019
- Ice Hockey, 2019, 2023, 2024, 2025

Langley has received two sportsmanship awards, one in AAA girls soccer in 2001 and one in AAA girls volleyball in 2007. In addition, Langley won first place in the Wachovia Cup standings in 1991–1992 for athletics.

=== United States Congressional Baseball Game ===
In 1977, rain forced the Congressional Baseball Game to play the annual game on Langley High School's baseball field after two previous rainouts on Memorial Stadium.

== Saxon Stage ==
Saxon Stage is the theatre department for Langley High School. The department produces three mainstage productions annually, a full-length play, a one-act play, and a musical. In addition, many student-written or student-directed works are performed throughout the year. Many Saxon Stage students are part of Troupe 3526 of the International Thespian Society.

=== List of productions ===
| Season | Fall Production | VHSL One-Act Play | Student Directed and In Class Productions | Spring Production |
|---|---|---|---|---|
| 2025-2026 | *The Play That Goes Wrong | Tracks | Willy Wonka Kids | **Grease |
| 2025-2026 | *The Play That Goes Wrong | Tracks | The 25th Annual Putnam County Spelling Bee | **Grease |
| 2024-2025 | **Beauty and the Beast | Final Dress Rehearsal | Disney's Frozen Kids | The Mousetrap |
| 2023-2024 | *Alice in Wonderland | Thank You For Flushing My Head in the Toilet | Postmortem | **Guys and Dolls |
| 2022-2023 | *The Man Who Came to Dinner | Fortress | Gravediggers | **Urinetown |
| 2021-2022 | Murder on the Orient Express | 26 Pebbles | The Lightning Thief | *Freaky Friday |
| 2021-2022 | Murder on the Orient Express | 26 Pebbles | Your Carving Footprint | *Freaky Friday |
| 2020-2021 | *Hey Stranger | Never Swim Alone | The Party Hop | - |
| 2019-2020 | *Romeo and Juliet | A Jury of Her Peers | Almost, Maine | Guys and Dolls (Canceled due to COVID-19 pandemic) |
| 2019-2020 | *Romeo and Juliet | A Jury of Her Peers | Love/Sick | Guys and Dolls (Canceled due to COVID-19 pandemic) |
| 2018-2019 | *Biloxi Blues | Pillowtalk | - | Mamma Mia! |
| 2017-2018 | The Dining Room | The Insanity of Mary Girard | - | *Evita |
| 2016-2017 | Harvey | - | - | *Gypsy |
| 2015-2016 | Almost, Maine | Meet the Roommates | - | *Chicago |
| 2014-2015 | *The Book of Days | 13 Ways to Screw Up Your College Interview | - | The 25th Annual Putnam County Spelling Bee |
| 2013-2014 | Little Women | Fearful Symmetry | - | *The Children's Hour |
| 2012-2013 | Romeo and Juliet | - | - | *The Life and Adventures of Nicholas Nickleby |
| 2011-2012 | Grease | - | - | *The Crucible |

*Indicates Cappies Program entry

**Indicates Brandon Victor Dixon Awards entry

As a result of the COVID-19 pandemic, the 2020–2021 season was mostly online, both Hey Stranger and The Party Hop were performed virtually.

=== VHSL One-Act Play Competition ===
Saxon Stage is a regular Class 6 competitor in the Virginia High School League (VHSL) One-Act Play Competition.

For the first time in Saxon Stage's history, Langley High School became the VHSL Liberty Conference 6A one-act competition champions in January 2014 when they won first place with its production of Fearful Symmetry. The production later won third place in the Region 6A North Competition, making it the highest-ranked student-directed production of the competition.

In March 2019, Langley High School won first place at the VHSL Class 6 State Competition with its production of Peter Tolan's comedic Pillowtalk. The two actors received Outstanding Actor commendations at the state level.

In February 2020, A Jury of Her Peers placed third in the Region 6 North Competition after winning first place at the sectional competition one month prior.

In 2021, Never Swim Alone placed first in the district, regional, and state VHSL competition.

In 2022, 26 Pebbles did not place past the district competition.

In 2023, Fortress placed second in the district and regional VHSL competition.

In 2024, Thank You For Flushing My Head in the Toilet did not place past the district competition.

=== Virginia Thespian Festival ===
Each year in January, members of Langley's International Thespian Honor Society Troupe attend the Virginia Thespian Festival, a statewide festival celebrating student achievements in theatre.

Students can participate in "Thespys", a national competition where students present either acting pieces or presentations of their technical work. Additionally, Saxon Stage performs their VHSL One-Act at VTF for adjudication.

Langley High School performed its fall mainstage production of Murder on the Orient Express as the mainstage production for VTF 2022. Saxon Stage also presented their VHSL One-Act 26 Pebbles for adjudication.

=== The Cappies ===
Langley High School participates in the National Capital Area division of the Cappies Critics and Awards Program for High School Theatre, "a year-long program for theatre and journalism students through which students attend and discuss each other's shows, write reviews for publication, and at the end of the season decide who of their colleague student performers and technicians should be honored for awards." The Langley High School Cappies Critic Team of youth journalists and theatre critics have had over 20 publications in local papers.

== Notable alumni ==
- Jack Abraham, entrepreneur and investor
- Bruce Allen, former general manager, Tampa Bay Buccaneers and Washington Redskins
- Michael Arndt, Academy Award-winning screenwriter, Little Miss Sunshine, Toy Story 3, and Star Wars: The Force Awakens
- Elizabeth Moore Aubin, U.S. ambassador to Algeria
- Rosebud Baker, comedian, actress, and writer
- Brian Basset, comic strip artist, creator of Adam@home and Red and Rover
- Ian Brzezinski, former Deputy Assistant Secretary of Defense for Europe and NATO Policy
- Ross Butler, actor, 13 Reasons Why, K.C. Undercover, and Shazam!
- Dede Byrne, Roman Catholic religious sister and anti-vaccine activist
- Paula Cale, actress, Providence
- Steve Czaban, sports radio personality
- Daniel Dixon, 2012, former basketball player, head coach for the Oklahoma City Blue
- Suzy Cobb Germain, former soccer player made one appearance for the United States women's national team
- Bijan Ghaisar, killed by US Park Police
- Lauren Graham, actress, Gilmore Girls, and Parenthood
- Thomas B. Griffith, former U.S. circuit judge of the U.S. Court of Appeals for the District of Columbia Circuit
- Jim Hagedorn, former U.S. Congressman
- Michael J. Hicks, economist and economics professor, Ball State University
- Anne Holton, president, George Mason University, former Secretary of Education for the Commonwealth of Virginia, former First Lady of Virginia (did not graduate)
- Dwight Holton, former United States Attorney for the District of Oregon
- Thomas Holtz, vertebrate paleontologist, principal lecturer at University of Maryland, College Park
- Juliet Huddy, talk radio host, The Morning Show with Mike and Juliet
- Ashley Iaconetti, TV personality, The Bachelor
- Matt Kaufmann, computer scientist and winner of the 2005 ACM Software System Award
- Jacob Labovitz, 2017, soccer player for Greenville Triumph
- Richard Leigh, country music songwriter
- G. David Low, astronaut
- Armin Mahbanoozadeh, professional figure skater
- Timothy C. May, cypherpunk and former chief scientist at Intel (did not graduate)
- Billy Abner Mayaya, Malawian human rights activist
- Sean McInerney, former American football defensive end for the Chicago Bears during the 1987 NFLPA strike
- James Gordon Meek, 1987, former ABC News producer and senior counter-terrorism advisor, child pornography distributor
- Jon Metzger, jazz vibraphonist
- Randy Minchew, former member, Virginia House of Delegates
- Vijay S. Pande, venture capitalist, founder of Folding@home
- Marisa Park, midfielder, Philippines women's national football team
- Jay Sborz, 2003, former professional baseball player, Detroit Tigers
- Lauren Shehadi, sportscaster
- William Wallace Smith, Partner, McChrystal Group LLC
- Nina Stemme, dramatic soprano opera singer
- Jeremy Stoppelman, co-founder and CEO, Yelp
- Michael Studeman, United States Navy rear admiral, director of the National Maritime Intelligence-Integration Office, commander of the Office of Naval Intelligence
- Rip Sullivan, member of Virginia House of Delegates
- Meejin Yoon, architect, architectural educator, dean, Cornell University College of Architecture, Art, and Planning
- Alana Hadid, Fashion designer, creative director, and activist

| Preceded by Memorial Stadium | Home of the United States Congressional Baseball Game; 1977 | Succeeded by Four Mile Run Park |
