= Meyerhoff Scholars Program =

Program supporting minority students pursuing academic careers in STEM

The Meyerhoff Scholars Program is a program at the University of Maryland, Baltimore County (UMBC) designed to prepare minority students for academic careers in the science, technology, engineering and math (STEM) disciplines. The program has served as a model for developing and supporting minority students pursuing academic careers.

== History ==
The program was founded at the UMBC in 1988 with a $500,000 grant from the Robert and Jane Meyerhoff Foundation, under the guidance of future UMBC President Freeman A. Hrabowski III. In the program's first year, it admitted only male African American students; female African American students were admitted in the program's second year. In 1997, the program opened to students of all races who were interested in supporting the advancement of minorities in academia, following the 1995 U.S. Supreme Court decision ruling the Benjamin Banneker Scholarship Program, another UMBC scholarship which had been only open to African American students, unconstitutional.

== Education Research ==
The Meyerhoff Scholars Program is noted for its success in increasing the representation of minority students in STEM. In an attempt to determine whether this model can be replicated at large universities, two scholarships were founded at other universities in 2013: the Chancellor's Science Scholarship at the University of North Carolina at Chapel Hill, and the Millennium Scholars Program at Pennsylvania State University.

== Notable alumni ==
- Jerome Adams: anesthesiologist and the 20th surgeon general of the United States
- Kizzmekia Corbett: viral immunologist at the NIAID (NIH) who helped develop one of the COVID-19 vaccines
- Kafui Dzirasa: psychiatrist and professor at Duke University
- Lola Eniola-Adefeso: Chemical Engineer and the University Diversity and Social Transformation Professor at the University of Michigan College of Engineering
- Anna Gifty Opoku-Agyeman: activist, writer, economist, and co-founder and former CEO of the Sadie Collective
- Crystal C. Watkins Johansson: neuroscientist, psychiatrist, and professor at Johns Hopkins University School of Medicine
