= Senioritis (musical) =

Musical

- Music: Riley Keenan; Dustin Merrell; AJ Pendola; Abi York
- Lyrics: Erick Pope; Maddie Underwood
- Book: Miriam Engle; Maggie Shaw

Senioritis is a high school musical comedy about the stresses of senior year and is a satire on teachers, parents, college admissions, celebrities, and the money culture. Written by nine students from Virginia and Maryland, it was performed in August 2007 at the Kennedy Center and made into a feature-length film, thanks to a grant from the Arts Council of Fairfax County, Virginia.

Senioritis tells the story of the senior class at Erma Schmoe High School, which unwittingly becomes the object of an experiment testing the famous laziness so common in the final year of high school. When the seniors bomb their first-quarter grades and tests, they get rejected by the elite "Holly League" colleges. They (and their hovering parents) fear that their lives are hopelessly ruined. Things go madly awry when the seniors get wise to the experiment and decide to get even by having the worst case of "senioritis" in history. The seniors put on a "high school mythical" about senioritis and become global sensations.

The score includes 18 original songs, on topics ranging from grade inflation ("C's and D's are Very Good for You") to college rejection letters ("However"), to hovering parents ("High School Parent Blues"), to the temptations of ambition ("Rich and Famous").

== Background ==
Senioritis was written by eight high-school students from various schools in the Baltimore–Washington metropolitan area. The "Creative Team" was selected in October 2006 under the direction of playwright and Cappies co-founder William Strauss. The student team consisted of book writers Miriam Engle and Maggie Shaw, lyricists Erick Pope and Maddie Underwood, composers Riley Keenan, Dustin Merrell, AJ Pendola, Abi York, and digital artist Tami Grossman. The students were given the task of writing a musical comedy about high school anxiety. A storyboard for the musical was completed in December, an initial script by the end of January, lyrics during much of February and March, and composing (under the direction of director Brant Challacombe) during March and April. Throughout May and June 2006 the book, lyrics, and score were revised continuously.

The Cappies hosted three script readings: two nonmusical readings in February and March by students at Stone Bridge High School and a musical reading in May by students from Winston Churchill High School. Following each reading, the script and score were substantially revised.

Senioritis premiered at the John F. Kennedy Center for the Performing Arts on August 6, 2007, under the direction of Stone Bridge High School theatre directorGlen Hochkeppel and Glenelg Country School musical director Brant Challacombe. Choreography was led by Amy Hard, cheographer at Robinson Secondary School.

== Synopsis ==
Senioritis is a musical comedy about real high schools, set in the very competitive world American education has become, satirizing all the many elements that lead to so-called "senioritis." Today's teenagers suffer anxiety about their relationships, parents, grades, college applications, and ambitions for the future. Many would rather pursue personal goals, but are forced into lives designed to impress others. Feeling burned out, high school seniors sometimes resort to drastic measures and forget about school altogether. This can have very negative consequences when all those years of hard work look like they're not paying off.

=== Act One ===
Act One begins with a typical day at Erma Schmoe High School. Evelyn Cummings, a high-achieving, intelligent senior, is stressing out over the many exams she has to take. Her boyfriend, Jared, persuades her and all the other seniors to follow the lead of Babbers, the school slacker, and "chillax" for a minute or two. When they do, they are observed by Agents X and Y, two so-called "experts" on the topic of senioritis, who persuade Stanley Krasston, the school's strict assistant principal, about performing an experiment on Erma Schmoe seniors, giving them poor grades and S-A-T test scores, to see how they respond. Krasston likes the idea because it gives him a chance to embarrass the school principal, his old high school classmate Meg Wivvans, a ditsy ex-hippie who got into colleges from which he was rejected.

Everything goes according to plan, and the seniors get rejected by all the elite "Holly League" colleges. They react not by becoming more motivated, but by despairing and not bothering to go to class any more. Under pressure from her mother, in a last-ditch effort to rescue her resume, Evelyn breaks up with Jared to go to Athens for a study abroad program. A parent-teacher meeting to discuss the seniors’ poor performances is interrupted by a surprise visit by the global celebrity Madonjelina, who decides to adopt Babbers as her "torn and tattered teen." The students hear rumors about the experiment that was done on them. Led by Jared, they decide to experiment back by having the largest epidemic of senioritis the world has ever seen.

=== Act Two ===
Act Two picks up the story four months later. The seniors are living in their school theater. After cutting class, pranking, and resisting authority for those months, the seniors founded Senioropolis, a commune based on the teachings of senioriticism. From Athens, Evelyn had sent Jared a plan for this society, and he brought it to life around the teachings of Babbers, alias "Seniocrates." When she returns, she and Jared get back together. Meanwhile, the parents are upset that their children have not been home in weeks and pressure the school superintendent to fire Principal Wivvans, who has tolerated the seniors’ occupation of the theater, and replace her with Assistant Principal Krasston, who promises a "crackdown."

Faced with the threat of being forced to shut down Senioropolis and repeat senior year, the seniors stage a "High School Mythical," starring Babbers as "Seniodysseus," who is lost at sea and must navigate the shoals of high school life. Madonjelina, now Babbers’ adoptive mother, drops by to see her son's performance, is given a starring role, turns the show into an instant world-wide sensation, and makes the seniors famous.

Even so, the superintendent is determined to make the seniors repeat their senior year, but just as she is about to announce her decision, Agents X and Y are unveiled as two high school seniors from Liechtenstein. The purpose of their experiment had been to slander American high school seniors as a way of enabling more Liechteinsteinians to be accepted by Holly League colleges. They are un-accepted, Krasston is fired, Wivvans keeps her job, and Madonjelina uses her clout to persuade the Hollies to pay the seniors (who are now global celebrities) to attend their schools. After Evelyn and Jared refuse the temptation of becoming "rich and famous," the Erma Schmoe seniors celebrate, off to better things with "admission to life."

== 2007 Premiere Cast ==
- Molly Dickerson as Evelyn Cummings
- Dustin Morris as Jared Jamison
- Megan Ort as Olivia Grenson
- Kyler Vaillancourt as Babbers
- Emma Earnest as Lily
- Megan Herrera as Melanie
- Matthew Xhignesse as Dexter
- James Singleton as Clif
- Samuel Brown as Timmy
- Julieann Choi as Agent X/Liecht
- Kate Kirschner as Agent Y/Stein
- Michael Sapp as Stanley Krasston
- Tess Talbot as Meg Wivvans
- Jennifer Petronzio as Madonjelina
- Mary Picard as Dr. Helga Hawkins and Browston
- Kathleen Smith as Raspy Gaspy
- Chelsea Cook as Felicity Forte
- Matthew Provance as G.C. Beaker and Terri
- Diego Maurera as Napoleon Charlemagne and Darryl Darrington
- Amanda Fernandez as Austen Bronte
- Angela Miller as Julie Cummings
- Elcid Strickland as Finbar Jamison
- Dan Hrebenak Bobby Babbers and Pennvard
- Gen Blau as Ophelia Grenson
- Ellen Rosebrough as Mom Krasston and Yalemouth
- Julia Katz as Cornumbia
