= Sherilynn Black =

American neuroscientist

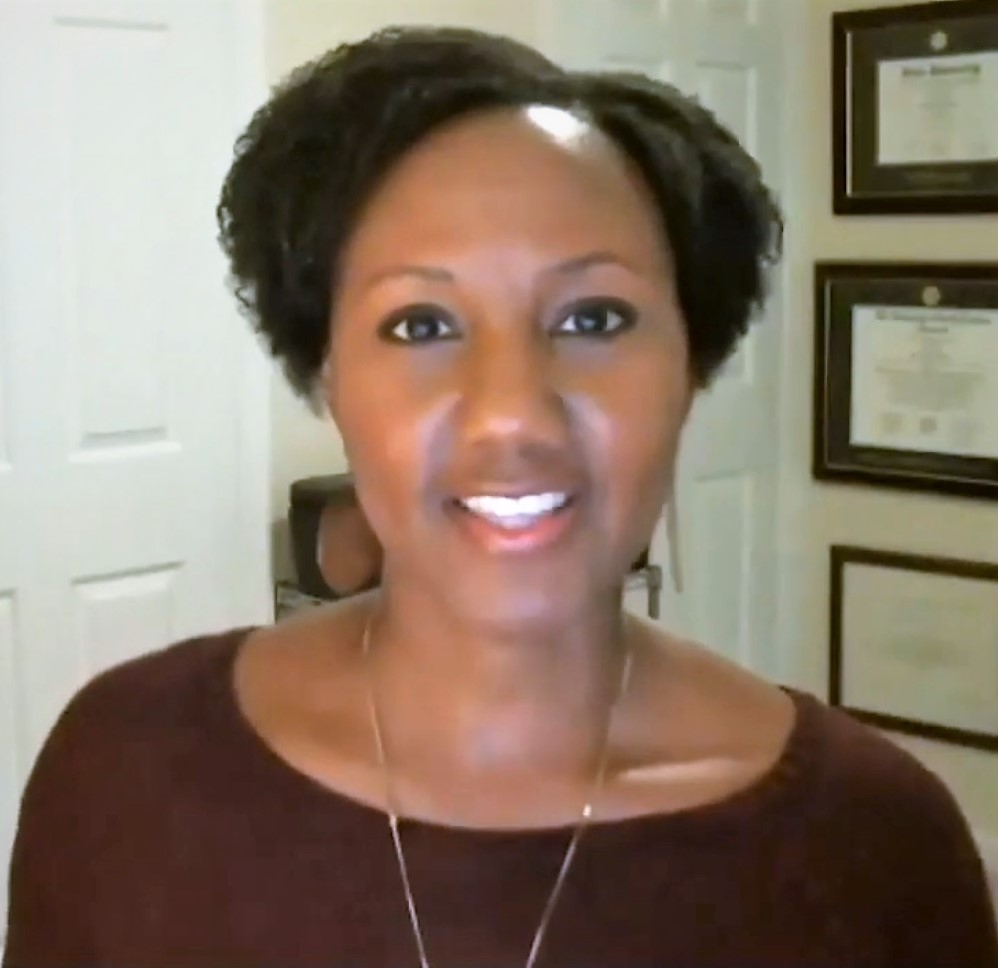
- Black speaks on Culturally Aware Mentorship for the National Institute of General Medical Sciences in 2020
- Born: North Carolina
- Education: B.S. University of North Carolina at Chapel Hill, Ph.D. and postdoctoral work at Duke University
- Known for: Developing programs to increase diversity and equity in graduate education
- Awards: Samuel Debois Cook Society Award; Deans Award for Inclusive Excellence in Graduate Education; Morehead-Cain Scholar
- Scientific career
- Fields: Neuroscience, Education
- Workplaces: Duke University School of Medicine

Sherilynn Black is an American neuroscientist and associate vice provost for faculty advancement, as well as an assistant professor of the practice of medical education at Duke University in Durham, North Carolina. Her research focuses on social neuroscience and developing interventions to promote diversity in academia.

== Early life and education ==
Black attended West Charlotte High School where she was president of student government and the National Honor Society. In addition, she volunteered at the United Way and Metrolina Food Bank and interned at Carolinas Medical Center, after which she considered a career in medicine. She pursued her undergraduate degree at the University of North Carolina at Chapel Hill. As a Morehead-Cain Scholar, Black majored in psychology and minored in biology. After graduating with the highest honors, Black continued in academia and pursued graduate work at Duke University in neurobiology. In 2002, Black became the first African American graduate student to pass the qualifying exam in that program. While completing her Ph.D., Black simultaneously studied education at UNC at Chapel Hill.

Black completed her graduate training in 2008 and stayed at Duke for postdoctoral training in the lab of Kafui Dzirasa from 2009 until 2012. Under Dzirasa's mentorship, Black studied the cortical control of the neural circuits underlying emotion. She found that optogenetic stimulation of cortical projection neurons had an antidepressant effect on mice, and through multi-region neural recordings, found that this stimulation drives synchronous neural activity across multiple limbic brain regions implicated in emotional regulation.

== Career and research ==
In 2010, the Office of Biomedical Graduate Diversity was established at Duke University, and Black was recruited as its first director. Black addressed issues such as imposter syndrome and the lack of role models for minority students by recruiting diverse students and faculty, and beginning recruitment early in undergraduate degrees. She created a multidisciplinary group and comprehensive program to begin to correct the gender and racial disparities in graduate education. She also oversaw the development of programs geared towards addressing the challenges that underrepresented students often face in academia. She later noted that diversity is frequently viewed only as a moral obligation, rather than as an intellectually essential concept that drives societal progress and scientific advancement. Black coordinated an annual retreat through the Office of Biomedical Graduate Diversity where all underrepresented graduate students have a chance to meet each other, develop friendships, and prepare for a successful Duke graduate school experience. Black's efforts doubled the number of applications to biomedical programs at Duke within the first 5 years, improving matriculation rates and student funding rates through fellowships.

In 2012, Black was appointed as assistant professor of the practice of medical education in the Ophthalmology and clinical science department at Duke University. One year later, in 2013, she was promoted to assistant professor of the practice of medical education in the department of medical education at Duke's School of Medicine. During this time, she conducted research to identify common variables leading to success in higher education in the science, technology, engineering and mathematics (STEM) student-development programs. She also developed computational models to predict the success of higher education programs. Recognizing that the challenges students faced were interconnected and often stemmed from the lack of supportive environments rather than academic preparedness, Black sought funding and collaboration to address these challenges, helping to secure a five-year National Institutes of Health grant of nearly $2 million to establish the Biosciences Collaborative for Research Engagement (BioCoRE). In this role, Black promoted both graduate and undergraduate research and the holistic development of biomedical scholars. She also facilitated resolution of conflicts between students and faculty, helping both parties navigate sensitive situations and build better communication. She advised students not to view every insensitive comment as a dismissal of their abilities and helped faculty understand the impact of their words while offering constructive ways to improve interactions.

As of 2017, Black was promoted to associate vice provost for faculty advancement. She serves as a faculty affiliate for the Duke Center for Science Education, a member of the President's Council on Black Affairs, a member of the Leadership Advisory Council on Underrepresented Minority Faculty, a member of the Advisory Council for Sexual and Gender Diversity, and the co-Advisor for the Duke Chapter of the Society for the Advancement of Chicanos and Native Americans in Science (SACNAS). In 2023, she was named co-chair of the National Academies of Science, Engineering, and Medicine (NASEM) Initiative, a new measure designed to better understand the "intersections between mentorship, professional development, and well-being across academic career stages."

Black has highlighted that hierarchical structures in academia and industry often hinder cultural change, as they encourage adherence to existing norms for self-preservation. Noting that while disrupting these power dynamics pose challenges to achieving equity, she underscores the need for institutional transformation, warning that without inclusive environments, underrepresentation and attrition will continue. Additionally, scientists may feel forced to assimilate into inequitable systems, negating the benefits of the diversity institutions seek to foster.

== Awards and honors ==
- 2019 Inaugural Speaker for the National Institutes of Environmental Health Sciences (NIEHS) Diversity Speaker Series
- Duke AHEAD Fellow
- Deans Award for Inclusive Excellence in Graduate Education
- 2015 Samuel DuBois Cook Society Award
- Morehead-Cain Scholar

== Appointments ==
- Howard Hughes Medical Institute Gilliam Fellowship mentor
- National Academy of Sciences, Engineering, and Medicine Committee Member
- American Association of Medical Colleges - Ph.D. Outreach Committee
- The Burroughs Wellcome Fund
- Society for Neuroscience - Faculty in the Neuroscience Scholars Program and Member of the Professional Development Committee

== Publications ==
Kumar, Sunil, Sherilynn J. Black, Rainbo Hultman, Steven T. Szabo, Kristine D. DeMaio, Jeanette Du, Brittany M. Katz, Guoping Feng, Herbert E. Covington, and Kafui Dzirasa. "Cortical control of affective networks." J Neurosci 33, no. 3 (January 16, 2013): 1116–29.

Mays, Alfred, Angela Byars-Winston, Antentor Hinton, Andrea G. Marshall, Annet Kirabo, Avery August, Bianca J. Marlin, et al. 2023. “Juneteenth in STEMM and the Barriers to Equitable Science.” Cell 186 (12): 2510–17. https://doi.org/10.1016/j.cell.2023.05.016.
