= The Research in Color Foundation =

Non-Profit Institution

Research in Color
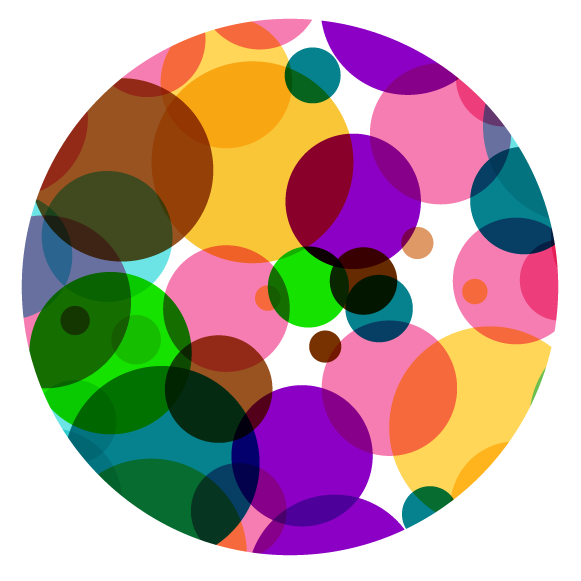
- Formation: 2019; 6 years ago
- Headquarters: Boston, Massachusetts
- Founders: Chinemelu Okafor
- Website: researchincolor.org

The Research in Color Foundation (Research in Colour) is a 501(c)(3) nonprofit that looks to enhance the recruitment and retention of economists of colour. It was founded by Chinemelu Okafor in 2019.

== History ==
The Research in Color Foundation was founded by Chinemelu Okafor in 2019. The organisation looks to increase the recruitment and retention of scholars of colour in economics and economics-adjacent fields. She has said that she founded Research in Color because economics is so critical to policy making there is a need for it to reflect the broader society it serves.

In January 2022 Research in Color worked with Abdul Latif Jameel Poverty Action Lab (JPAL) to deliver the Economics Transformation Project. The collaboration looks to increase the number of women/people from historically marginalised groups in economics.

In May 2022 Research in Color partnered with the Jain Family Institute to extend their scholarship programme to economists who are not US citizens. In July, the Institute for Fiscal Studies announced a partnership with Research in Color.

In November 2022 Innovations for Poverty Action and Research in Color devised the IPA Scholar programme that provides mentorship and funding to economists of colour.

=== Chinemelu Okafor ===
Okafor is Nigerian American. She completed her undergraduate degree at the University of Michigan, where she earned a Bachelor's degree in International Studies. She was a pre-doctoral student at Princeton University. She is a doctoral researcher in the Department of Government at Harvard University. Her efforts to improve academic research culture were recognised by Forbes 30 Under 30, who named Okafor as one of the world's top young people in education.

== Activity ==
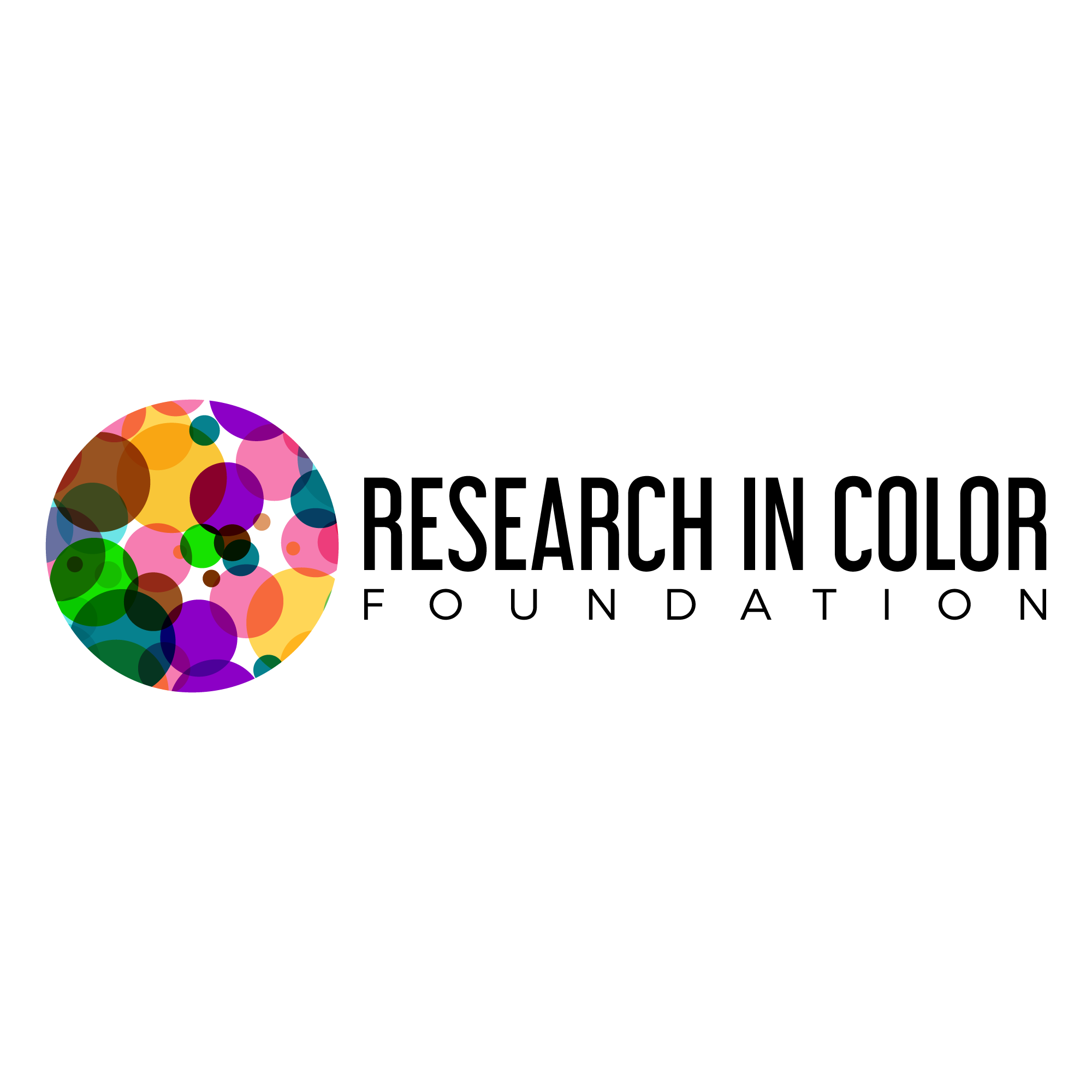
Research in Colour Official Logo

Research in Color provide financial assistance and mentoring to aspiring economists of colour. The scheme pairs scholars from historically excluded groups with established economists. The mentorship scheme provides mentors and mentees with the opportunities to collaborate on an eight-month research project. The programme supports around twenty economists of colour every year.

The nonprofit also organises an annual conference that takes place in August of each year.

== See also ==
- Sadie Collective
- Abdul Latif Jameel Poverty Action Lab
