= Anna Gifty Opoku-Agyeman =

Ghanaian-born American activist, writer

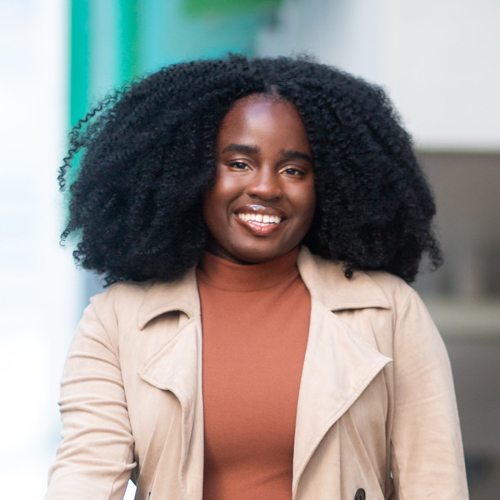
- Anna Gifty Opoku-Agyeman in 2019
- Born: 1996 (age 29–30); Kumasi, Ghana
- Known for: Sadie Collective; Black Birders Week
- Awards: Meyerhoff Scholarship National Science Foundation Graduate Research Fellowship Ford Foundation Pre-doctoral Fellowship

Academic background
- Education: University of Maryland, Baltimore County (BA) Harvard University (MA) Harvard Kennedy School (Ph.D. in progress)
- Website: www.annagifty.com

Anna Gifty Opoku-Agyeman (born 1996) is a Ghanaian-born American researcher, activist, and writer. She is a co-founder and former CEO of the Sadie Collective, as well as a co-founder and former co-organizer of Black Birders Week. Opoku-Agyeman is the editor of The Black Agenda: Bold Solutions for a Broken System and author of The Double Tax: How Women of Color are Overcharged and Underpaid.

== Early life and education ==
Opoku-Agyeman was born in Kumasi, Ghana, and moved to the United States as a child. She primarily grew up in Columbia, Maryland and participated in the Head Start (program).

Opoku-Agyeman graduated from St. John's Parish Day School in Ellicott City, Maryland in 2007, and from Glenelg Country School, also in Ellicott City, in 2014. In 2019, she earned a B.A. in mathematics with a minor in economics from the University of Maryland, Baltimore County (UMBC). As an undergraduate, Opoku-Agyeman was a Meyerhoff Scholar and NIH MARC U*STAR Scholar, and was enrolled in the UMBC Honors College.

After graduating from college, Opoku-Agyeman attended the American Economic Association’s summer training program, which aims to increase diversity in economics "by preparing talented undergraduates for doctoral programs in economics and related disciplines". She then spent the 2019–2020 academic year enrolled in the Harvard University Research Scholar Initiative postbaccalaureate program. While Opoku-Agyeman was in the Harvard postbaccalaureate program, she was a research assistant to an economics professor at Harvard Graduate School of Education and was affiliated with the National Bureau of Economic Research.

She is currently a doctoral student in Public Policy and Economics at the Harvard Kennedy School as a National Science Foundation Graduate Research Fellow, a Ford Foundation Graduate Fellow, a Russell Sage Foundation Dissertation Fellow, Roosevelt Institute Graduate Fellow, a Stone PhD Scholar in Inequality and Wealth Concentration, and a Women and Public Policy Program Doctoral Affiliate. In 2023, she was among those selected for Forbes 30 Under 30 Local Boston class. In 2025, she earned her M.A. in Public Policy with a concentration in Economics.

== Career ==
=== The Sadie Collective ===
In 2018, Opoku-Agyeman and Fanta Traore co-founded a nonprofit organization called the Sadie Collective, which aims to increase the number of Black women working in quantitative data fields, including economics, data science, and public policy. The collective offers mentorship and hosts programming, including the annual Sadie Tanner Mossell Alexander Conference for Economics and Related Fields. Opoku-Agyeman served as the CEO of the organization until March 2021. Several of her published works and media features, which advocate for the advancement and inclusion of black women in economics, have been the result of collaboration with Lisa D. Cook, the first African American woman to sit on the Federal Reserve Board of Governors.

=== Black Birders Week ===
In 2020, Opoku-Agyeman co-founded and co-organized Black Birders Week, a series of online events organized to highlight and celebrate Black birders, naturalists, and outdoor enthusiasts. Her aim was to improve the visibility of Black people in non-stereotypical situations, and to advocate for science organizations to give Black people the platform and resources to engage in engagement and outreach activities. Additionally, the inaugural Black Birders Week produced content in collaboration with the National Audubon Society and the Monterey Bay Aquarium. Opoku-Agyeman, alongside the founding members of Black Birders Week, received the Richard and Patricia Kane Conservation and Education Award in 2020.

=== The Double Tax ===
In 2025, Opoku-Agyeman wrote The Double Tax: How Women of Color are Overcharged and Underpaid with a foreword from Chelsea Clinton. The book analyzes the costs associated with racism and sexism women face across a lifetime. Opoku-Agyeman explores topics across beauty, career, housing, motherhood, caregiving, and retirement using quantitative and qualitative data. The term "the double tax", as defined by the book, has been used to describe racial and gender disparities in Unemployment, Homeownership, and the Cannabis industry. Several organizations and academic institutions have hosted talks about the book such as the Bank of England, The Century Foundation, and St. Catherine University. On tour, Opoku-Agyeman was joined by Chelsea Clinton, Hope Walz, Governor Tim Walz's daughter, and Mikki Kendall, the author of Hood Feminism. The Double Tax was named by the Los Angeles Times as one of the best science books of 2025 by Alie Ward, the host of Ologies (podcast). In an interview with The Persistent, she explained why Black women pay more for good and services while they are paid less at work.

In 2026, Opoku-Agyeman delivered the CEW+ Mullin Welch Endowed Lecture at Ford School of Public Policy based on the book. She later co-authored an article with Ayanna Pressley that discussed the book in reference to Equal Pay Day for Black women. The Double Tax won the 2026 WOMEN'S WAY Book Prize (previously known as the Ernesta Drinker Ballard Book Prize) from Women's Way.

=== Awards and honors ===
- WOMEN'S WAY Book Prize (formerly the Ernesta Drinker Ballard Book Prize), 2026
- LA Times Best Science Book Selection, 2025
- Forbes 30 Under 30 Local Boston, 2023

== Works ==
=== Academic publications ===
- Opoku-Agyeman, Anna Gifty; Rackstraw, Emma (2026). "Belief Updating, Observability, and Race in the Labor Market". AEA Papers and Proceedings. 116: 422–425. doi:10.1257/pandp.20261085.
- Campbell, Petreena S.; Mavingire, Nicole; Khan, Salma; Rowland, Leah K.; Wooten, Jonathan V.; Opoku-Agyeman, Anna; Guevara, Ashley; Soto, Ubaldo; Cavalli, Fiorella; Loaiza-Pérez, Andrea Irene; Nagaraj, Gayathri; Denham, Laura J.; Adeoye, Olayemi; Jenkins, Brittany D.; Davis, Melissa B.; Schiff, Rachel; Brantley, Eileen J. (2019). "AhR ligand aminoflavone suppresses α6-integrin-Src-Akt signaling to attenuate tamoxifen resistance in breast cancer cells". Journal of Cellular Physiology. 234 (1): 108–121. doi:10.1002/jcp.27013. ISSN 0021-9541. PMC 6202151. PMID 30076704.
- Opoku-Agyeman, Anna Gifty (2020). "The Impact of Early Childhood Malaria Risk on the Probability of School Delay in Ghana" (PDF). UMBC Journal of Undergraduate Research. 21: 47.

=== Books ===
- "The Double Tax: How Women of Color are Overcharged and Underpaid," by Anna Gifty Opoku-Agyeman, with foreword by Chelsea Clinton.
- "The Black Agenda: Bold Solutions for a Broken System," Edited by Anna Gifty Opoku-Agyeman, with foreword by Tressie McMillan Cottom and essayists including Dr. Sandy Darity, Dr. Hedwig Lee, Mary Heglar, and Janelle Jones.

=== Selected Essays ===
- Cook, Lisa D.; Opoku-Agyeman, Anna Gifty (September 30, 2019). "'It Was a Mistake for Me to Choose This Field'". The New York Times.
- Francis, Dania; Opoku-Agyeman, Anna Gifty (June 11, 2020). "Economists' Silence on Racism Is 100 Years in the Making". Newsweek.
- Opoku-Agyeman, Anna Gifty (November 14, 2024). "DEI Attacks Are Widening the Racial Wealth Gap". Bloomberg Opinion. Bloomberg LP.
- Cooper, Marianne; Opoku-Agyeman, Anna Gifty (September 9, 2025). "Rising Unemployment Among Black Women Is a Bad Economic Sign". Time.
- Pressley, Ayanna; Opoku-Agyeman, Anna Gifty (July 21, 2026). "The attack on workers begins and ends with Black women". The Boston Globe.
