= Dede Byrne =

Roman Catholic nun and physician

Deirdre "Dede" Byrne POSC
- Education: Virginia Tech; Georgetown University (M.D.)
- Occupations: Religious sister; Missionary; Surgeon
- Relatives: William Draper Byrne (brother)
- Military career
- Allegiance: United States
- Branch: United States Army
- Service years: 1978-1989 (Active); 1989-2009 (Reserve)
- Rank: Colonel

Deirdre "Dede" Byrne, POSC is an American Catholic religious sister, missionary, surgeon, and retired U.S. Army colonel. She is a member of the Little Workers of the Sacred Hearts of Jesus and Mary.

== Early life and education ==
Byrne grew up in the Washington suburb of McLean, Virginia, in a devoutly Catholic family as one of eight siblings. She is the older sister of Bishop William Byrne of the Diocese of Springfield, known for taking over the western Massachusetts diocese as it was still dealing with the aftermath of allegations of sexual abuse and cover-ups.

Byrne attended Langley High School and later graduated from Virginia Tech. After attending Virginia Tech, she was accepted to Georgetown School of Medicine, where her father and two brothers had also attended. With finances tight, Byrne joined the U.S. Army in 1978 as a medical student and received a military medical scholarship.

== Career ==
After three years of family medicine residency at the U.S. Army hospital in Fort Belvoir, Virginia, she served as a full-time officer for 13 months in the Sinai Peninsula. Here, she acted as a liaison between the U.S. Army and the monks of St. Catherine's Monastery, located at the base of Mount Sinai. After this, Byrne volunteered to serve in Korea in order to practice family and emergency medicine. She served as a full-time Army officer from 1982 to 1989, remaining in the Army Reserve after 1989 until her retirement."

In 1989, Byrne spent a year performing missionary medicine in India. In 1990, she was accepted into an Army surgical residency program, but deferred this to do surgical training in Georgetown, ending in 1994. In 1996, as chief surgical resident, she was the first assistant for Cardinal Hickey, after he received open-heart surgery. In 1997, Byrne delivered medical care to Mother Teresa, when she visited Washington for five days. After this, Byrne went on to practice in Ventura, California and completed her board certification in surgery in 2000. Later that year, she returned to Washington to discern joining the Little Workers of the Sacred Hearts of Jesus and Mary. She admired the order for their humility and making only minor changes over the years, noting that the "storm of Vatican II blew over their heads, and all they felt was a little breeze."

In 2001, during the September 11 attacks, she went to the World Trade Center site for the first two days following the attack. She worked in a first aid tent and dispensed supplies and support to firefighters.

She took her formal formation in 2002 and completed her first religious vows in 2004. However, her religious life was interrupted when the army brought her back as a reservist in 2003, and deployed her three times over the next six years. In 2003, she served at the Walter Reed National Military Medical Center in Washington, in 2005 at Fort Carson in Colorado, and in 2008 she was deployed to Afghanistan, where she cared for wounded citizens.

In 2009, after returning from Afghanistan, Byrne retired from the U.S. Army at the rank of Colonel. She professed her final vows as a nun two years later. In February 2022, she successfully assisted an Afghan family in evacuating from Afghanistan, after they became targets of the Taliban following the 2021 takeover of the country.

On the Fourth of July, 2019, Byrne was praised by President Donald Trump, who thanked her for her lifetime of service. On August 26, 2020, she spoke at the Republican National Convention and described Trump as "the most pro-life president this nation has ever had, defending life at all stages." She later stated that she decided to appear at the RNC after being distraught by seeing Sr Simone Campbell and Fr James Martin speak at the 2020 Democratic National Convention. In March 2021, she co-signed a letter condemning "abortion-tainted" COVID-19 vaccines. In April, she called on the anti-abortion movement to be "battle ready" as "soldiers for Christ" in the fight against abortion.

On March 9, 2022, Byrne with the Thomas More Society filed a lawsuit against Muriel Bowser, LaQuandra Nesbitt, and the District of Columbia for denying her a religious exemption to its COVID-19 vaccination mandate for health care workers. In August 2021, the district had begun requiring vaccination for health care workers, including exemptions for medical or religious reasons. Byrne's application for exemption was denied and decided to file the lawsuit on the basis of the Religious Freedom Restoration Act, after the city suspended her medical license for remaining unvaccinated. On March 11, Washington officials notified Byrne that her medical license was restored and would remain active until September 2022. On March 15, Byrne received a letter from Bowser, notifying her that she was granted a religious exemption to the COVID-19 vaccine, allowing her to resume her work as a surgeon and physician until 2023.

In 2025, Byrne praised the appointment of Robert F. Kennedy Jr. as the U.S. Secretary of Health and Human Services.
