= LaQuandra S. Nesbitt =

American family physician

LaQuandra S. Nesbitt is an American family physician who in 2022 joined the George Washington University School of Medicine & Health Sciences (SMHS) as the executive director of the Center for Population Health Sciences and Health Equity. Prior to this, Nesbitt was the Washington, D.C. Department of Health Director who was appointed by Mayor Muriel Bowser in 2015. Prior to her tenure in DC, Nesbitt was Director of the Louisville Metro Department of Public health and Wellness.

== Early life and education ==
At the University of Michigan, Nesbitt earned her undergraduate degree in biochemistry before getting her medical degree from Wayne State University School of Medicine and a MPH with a concentration in Health Care Management and Policy from the Harvard School of Public Health.

Her internship was done at University Hospitals of Cleveland/University Hospitals of Cleveland and her family medicine residence at University of Maryland's Department of Family Medicine. Sje went on to serve a Minority Health Policy Fellowship at Commonwealth Fund Harvard University.

== Career ==
Her time in Louisville focused on violence prevention and implementing the Affordable Care Act. While there, Governor Steve Beshear appointed her to a four-year term on the Early Childhood Advisory Council. She was appointed to a similar position in DC at the State Early Childhood Development Coordinating Council and is Chair of the Association of State and Territorial Health Official's Performance Improvement and Accreditation Policy Committee.

Nesbitt was one of the parties sued by Dede Byrne and the Thomas More Society for being denied a religious exemption for the COVID-19 vaccination mandate for health care workers.

In 2022, Nesbitt joined the George Washington University School of Medicine & Health Sciences (SMHS) as the executive director of the Center for Population Health Sciences and Health Equity.

== Publications ==
Population Health: Management, Policy, and Technology, executive editor
