= Crystal C. Watkins Johansson =

American neuroscientist

- Born: Baltimore, Maryland
- Education: University of Maryland, Baltimore County; Johns Hopkins University
- Known for: Role of nitric oxide synthase in diabetic gastrointestinal dysfunction
- Awards: Meyerhoff Scholar, Top 100 Women in Maryland, Physician of the Year by the Daily Record, UMBC Outstanding Alumnus in Natural & Mathematical Sciences
- Scientific career
- Fields: Neuroscience
- Workplaces: Johns Hopkins University School of Medicine

Crystal C. Watkins Johansson is an American neuroscientist and psychiatrist and associate professor of neuroscience at Johns Hopkins University School of Medicine as well as the director of the Sheppard Pratt Memory Clinic in Neuropsychiatry in Baltimore, Maryland. Johansson was the first Black female Meyerhoff Scholar to obtain an MD/PhD from the University of Maryland, Baltimore County. During her MD/PhD she developed a novel treatment for gastrointestinal in patients with diabetes that led to a patent for a pharmacological compound in 2000. Johansson is a practicing neuropsychiatrist with a focus on geriatric psychiatry and she conducts brain imaging research as well as research on cancer in African American women.

== Early life and education ==
Johansson was born and raised in Baltimore, Maryland. She wanted to become a doctor from a young age. She attended public school in Baltimore City and became the first Black president of the student government at Dulaney High School in Cockeysville. During high school, she completed an internship through the Nursing Program at Johns Hopkins to begin to explore the field of medicine.

In 1991, Johansson attended the University of Maryland, Baltimore County (UMBC) for her undergraduate education. She was supported by the Meyerhoff Scholarship Program which is a competitive program that funds the undergraduate degrees of underrepresented minorities at UMBC. She majored in biological sciences and was interested in diabetes research since her grandmother had diabetes. Johansson graduated in 1995 with a Bachelors of Science.

After completing her undergraduate degree, Johansson pursued her MD/PhD training at Johns Hopkins University School of Medicine. During her PhD training, she worked in the Department of Molecular and Cellular Neuroscience under the mentorship of Solomon H. Snyder, whom she met as an undergraduate at UMBC. She became a Society for Neuroscience Fellow, an Academic Medicine Fellow of the National Medical Fellowships and Bristol-Myers Squibb Inc. Her thesis was titled "Nitric Oxide and Carbon Monoxide: Novel Neurotransmitters in the Enteric Nervous System". For her graduate work, she explored the mechanisms underlying gastrointestinal dysfunction in patients with diabetes. She found that in mouse models of diabetes, there is a significant reduction in neuronal nitric oxide synthase mRNA and that insulin treatment restores the nNOS levels. Further, the delay in gastric emptying can be reversed with the phosphodiesterase inhibitor, sildenafil. Her PhD work led to a patent for a drug to treat neuropathic pain in patients with diabetes and the work was covered in the Wall Street Journal. Johansson completed her MD/PhD in 2003, becoming the first female Meyerhoff Scholar to obtain an MD/PhD. Johansson was also one of only three Black women at the time to graduate with a doctorate in molecular and cellular neuroscience from Johns Hopkins University School of Medicine.

Johansson continued her medical training at JHU, pursuing her residency training in psychiatry. She completed her Internship at Sinai Hospital at Johns Hopkins in 2004, and then went on to complete her residency training in Psychiatry and Behavioral Sciences in 2008. During her residency, she became the Chief Resident of Psychiatry and also completed her postdoctoral work under the mentorship of Martin G. Pomper using the novel Positron Emission Tomography ligand, TSPO, to visualize neuroinflammation in the human brain. She then completed a fellowship in Mood Disorders and Neuroimaging at Johns Hopkins in 2009. She then completed another Fellowship in Geriatric Psychiatry in 2011.

== Career and research ==
In 2011, Johansson became an assistant professor of psychiatry at Johns Hopkins University. In 2014, she became the Director of the Sheppard Pratt Memory Clinic in Neuropsychiatry and has since been promoted to associate professor at JHU. As a clinician and a professor, Johansson treats patients, conducts clinical research, and educates the future generation of physicians.

Johansson is actively involved in advocacy, mentorship, and education. She co-founded a literacy program for youth and teaches adolescents about preventing teen pregnancy. She is also on the ABRCMS Steering Committee which hosts the largest professional conference for underrepresented students. On the clinical side, Johansson volunteers with the Adolescent Depression Awareness Program which educated high school students, teachers, and parents about adolescent depression. She has been featured on several news broadcasting networks such as WBALTV, The Maryland Daily Record, The Baltimore Sun, WYPR, Science Magazine, and ConscienHealth.

=== HIV/AIDs medical service and research ===
Johansson has been committed to educating communities and patients about HIV/AIDs prevention as well as conducting research on the psychological and neurological complications of the various stages of infection. She worked with the Ministry of Health in Ghana to implement HIV/AID health education and prevention programs. In the laboratory and the clinic, Johansson has explored the severity and prevalence of the neuropsychiatric complications of HIV infection that remain regardless of antiretroviral therapy due to the harboring of virus in microglia and astrocytes in the brain. Based on the infection of glial cells in patients with HIV, Johansson has also conducted studies exploring the extent of neuroinflammation in patients with HIV using Positron Emission Tomography with the PET ligand TSPO. The positive signal associated with the TSPO ligand is thought to be correlated with increased glial cell activation. She found that there were white matter abnormalities in patients with HIV on combination antiretroviral therapies compared to controls and white matter abnormalities increased in patients that also had HIV associated dementia.

=== Psychological coping strategies and disease progression ===
As a neuropsychiatrist, Johansson treats memory loss and provides geriatric psychiatry services. She also explores how psychiatric or psychological dysfunction relates to cancer and systemic disease progression and recovery, with a focus on African American women, who are understudied in clinical research. She has found that African American women with breast cancer and undergoing chemotherapy treatment benefit from comprehensive psychological care programs in terms of coping capacity and distress associated with disease. She has also explored how chemotherapy affects daily life in African American women.

== Awards and honors ==
- 1992-1995 Meyerhoff Scholar
- 1999 Predoctoral National Research Service Award
- 2004 Outstanding Intern of the Year JHUSOM
- 2006 Visionary Leadership Award from UMBC
- 2009 UMBC Outstanding Alumnus in Natural & Mathematical Sciences
- 2012 named Top 100 Women in Maryland
- 2016 Levi Watkins Inaugural Keynote Lecturer
- 2019 name Health Care Hero by the Daily Record
- 2019 name Physician of the Year by the Daily Record

== Select publications ==
- Pieper AA, Brat DJ, Krug DK, et al. Poly(ADP-ribose) polymerase-deficient mice are protected from streptozotocin-induced diabetes. Proc Natl Acad Sci U S A. 1999;96(6):3059‐3064. doi:10.1073/pnas.96.6.3059
- Watkins CC, Sawa A, Jaffrey S, et al. Insulin restores neuronal nitric oxide synthase expression and function that is lost in diabetic gastropathy [published correction appears in J Clin Invest 2000 Sep;106(6):803]. J Clin Invest. 2000;106(3):373‐384. doi:10.1172/JCI8273
- Watkins CC, Boehning D, Kaplin AI, Rao M, Ferris CD, Snyder SH. Carbon monoxide mediates vasoactive intestinal polypeptide-associated nonadrenergic/noncholinergic neurotransmission. Proc Natl Acad Sci U S A. 2004;101(8):2631‐2635. doi:10.1073/pnas.0308695100
- Johansson P, Jones DE, Watkins CC, Haisfield-Wolfe ME, Gaston-Johansson F. Physicians' and nurses' experiences of the influence of race and ethnicity on the quality of healthcare provided to minority patients, and on their own professional careers. J Natl Black Nurses Assoc. 2011;22(1):43‐56.
- Watkins CC, Pieper AA, Treisman GJ. Safety considerations in drug treatment of depression in HIV-positive patients: an updated review. Drug Saf. 2011;34(8):623‐639. doi:10.2165/11592070-000000000-00000
- Watkins CC, Treisman GJ. Neuropsychiatric complications of aging with HIV. J Neurovirol. 2012;18(4):277‐290. doi:10.1007/s13365-012-0108-z
- Rahn KA, Watkins CC, Alt J, et al. Inhibition of glutamate carboxypeptidase II (GCPII) activity as a treatment for cognitive impairment in multiple sclerosis. Proc Natl Acad Sci U S A. 2012;109(49):20101‐20106. doi:10.1073/pnas.1209934109
- Watkins CC, Sawa A, Pomper MG. Glia and immune cell signaling in bipolar disorder: insights from neuropharmacology and molecular imaging to clinical application. Transl Psychiatry. 2014;4(1):e350. Published 2014 Jan 21. doi:10.1038/tp.2013.119
- Watkins CC, Andrews SR. Clinical studies of neuroinflammatory mechanisms in schizophrenia. Schizophr Res. 2016;176(1):14‐22. doi:10.1016/j.schres.2015.07.018
- Watkins CC, Kamara Kanu I, Hamilton JB, Kozachik SL, Gaston-Johansson F. Differences in Coping Among African American Women With Breast Cancer and Triple-Negative Breast Cancer. Oncol Nurs Forum. 2017;44(6):689‐702. doi:10.1188/17.ONF.689-702
