= Glenelg Country School =

Private school in Howard County, Maryland, US

- 12793 Folly Quarter Road; Ellicott City, Maryland; United States

Information
- Type: Private school
- Established: 1954
- Head of school: Matthew J. Walsh
- Faculty: 214
- Colors: Green and white
- Mascot: Dragons
- Website: glenelg.org
- Glenelg Manor
- U.S. National Register of Historic Places
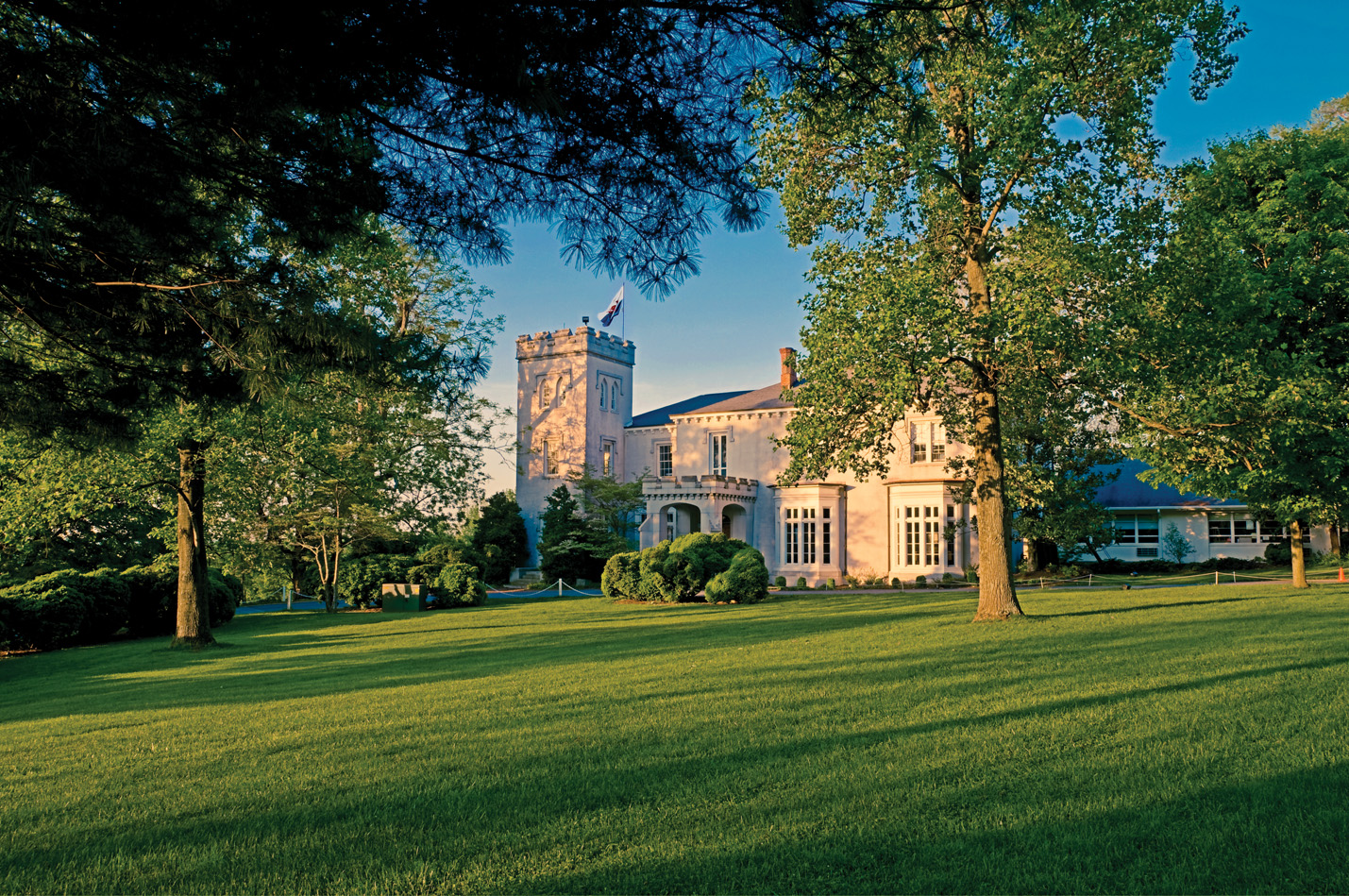
- Glenelg Manor

- Location within Maryland Location within the United States
- Nearest city: Glenelg, Maryland
- Coordinates: 39°15′07″N 76°57′42″W
- Area: 50 acres (20 ha)
- Built: 1851
- Architectural style: Gothic Revival
- NRHP reference No.: 83002952
- Added to NRHP: 3 February 1983

Glenelg Country School is a nonsectarian, co-educational independent day school in Howard County, Maryland, adjacent to Columbia, Maryland and between Baltimore and Washington, D.C. The School offers a continuous college-preparatory program from age 2 through grade 12. GCS was founded in 1954, enrolling 35 students in grades one through seven. In the fall of 1985, the new Upper School division opened with 10 students. The first class graduated in June 1989. Today, Glenelg Country School enrolls over 750 students.

== History ==
The Glenelg Manor was built on a part of land patented as "Dorsey's Grove" in 1721. It also included land patented by John Dorsey named "Dorseys Luck" renamed to "Howard's Resolution". Glenelg Manor houses the Glenelg Country School elementary division. The original structure of the house dates from circa 1740 to the second half of the 18th century, and may have been built by Ephraim Howard.

General Joseph Tyson built the Tudor expansion in the 1800s The estate passed to Tyson's son Henry H. Tyson, followed by the Knox family in 1900. William Bladen Lowndes, son of Maryland governor Lloyd Lowndes, Jr., purchased the estate in 1915 and added amenities such as outdoor projectors, golf course, and diesel generators. After Lowndes died in 1941, the property was sold to Rowland D. and George R. Zaiser of Wilton Farm Dairy for farming. In 1956 the estate was subdivided into a smaller parcel to be leased out as a school.

It was listed on the National Register of Historic Places in 1983.

== Glenelg Country School ==
The original building was rented in 1954 when the Glenelg Country School was founded by Kingdon Gould, Jr. and his wife Mary Thorne Gould, along with Mr. and Mrs. John T. Mason, Jr., Judge James Macgill and Mr. and Mrs. William Shippen. Marjorie Dunn was the first Headmistress for Glenelg Country School, serving 1954–1956. Subsequent Headmasters/Headmistresses: Beatrice Pfefferkorn (1956–1959); Edward L. Jones (1959–1964); Peter T. Terry (1964–1966); Thomas J. Barlow (interim head in 1966 for Peter Terry); Frederic W. Rhinelander (1966–1977); Charles H. Miller, Jr. (1977–1990); Ryland O. Chapman III (1990–2007); Gregory J. Ventre (2007–2021); and Matthew J. Walsh (2021–present).

In 2014, County Executive Ken Ulman proposed CR-121-2014 in his last weeks of pre-election activities. The bill would finance eight million dollars of an expansion and revitalization of the athletic facilities, a two–story press box, grandstands and restoration of existing tennis courts and athletic center floors. It included the renovation and restoration of buildings and the Historic Manor House.

=== Overview ===
- 835 students age 2 through grade 12
- 111 faculty members, 11 assistant teachers; 65% of faculty hold advanced degrees
- Student/Faculty Ratio: 6:1
- Average Class Size: 15
- 18 Advanced Placement courses offered
- College Placement: 2 full-time college counselors; Class of 2015 SAT average score of 1846; 100% of seniors are accepted to four-year colleges or universities; the class of 2015 was awarded over $5.8 million in merit scholarships

== Notable alumni ==
- Isaiah Miles (born 1994), basketball player in the Israeli Basketball Premier League
- Anna Gifty Opoku-Agyeman, writer, activist, economist; co-founder of the Sadie Collective and Black Birders Week

=== Athletics ===
- 2006 - Varsity Girls Tennis won the IAAM B Conference Championship
- 2006 - Ice Hockey won the MIAA C Conference Championship
- 2007 - Varsity Boys Basketball won the MIAA C Conference Championship
- 2007 - Women's Cross Country won the Private School's State Championship
- 2008 - Varsity Tennis won the MIAA B Conference Championship; the team also brought home two individual titles
- 2008 - Ice Hockey won the MIAA B Conference Championship
- 2010 - Varsity Golf won the MIAA B Conference Championship
- 2010 - Varsity Boys Lacrosse makes MIAA B Conference Championship for first time in program history
- 2011 - Varsity Women's Field Hockey won the IAAM B Conference Championship
- 2011 - Varsity Women's Cross Country won the IAAM C Conference Championship
- 2011 - Varsity Boys Basketball won the MIAA B Conference Championship
- 2011 - Varsity Boys Basketball Team moved up to the MIAA A Conference
- 2013 - Varsity Boys Baseball won the MIAA B Conference Championship
- 2013 - Varsity Boys Cross Country won the MIAA B Conference Championship
- 2014 - Varsity Girls Soccer won the IAAM C Conference Championship (undefeated season)
- 2015 - Varsity Girls Lacrosse won the IAAM B Conference Championship
- 2015 - Varsity Girls Soccer won the IAAM C Conference Championship
- 2016 - Varsity Girls Lacrosse won the IAAM B Conference Championship
- 2016 - Varsity Girls Lacrosse team moved up to the IAAM A Conference
- 2017 - Varsity Girls Indoor Track and Field won the IAAM B Conference Championship
- 2017 - Varsity Girls Outdoor Track and Field won the IAAM B Conference Championship

=== The Arts ===
Music and art classes begin at age 2 and continue through twelfth grade. Music classes include: chorus; recorder ensembles; bell choirs; bands; a jazz ensemble; a woodwind trio; a string quartet; Lower, Upper School plays; Middle and Upper School musicals, with 50% of Upper School students participating in the performing arts. There are music rooms in each division and a 350-seat Mulitz Theater with a scenery shop and dressing rooms.

Art classes include: painting, drawing, film and digital photography, ceramics, wood-working, metals, and other specialized classes. Each division has a studio space. The Upper School has separate 2-D and 3-D facilities and a black/white photography lab.

== Gallery ==
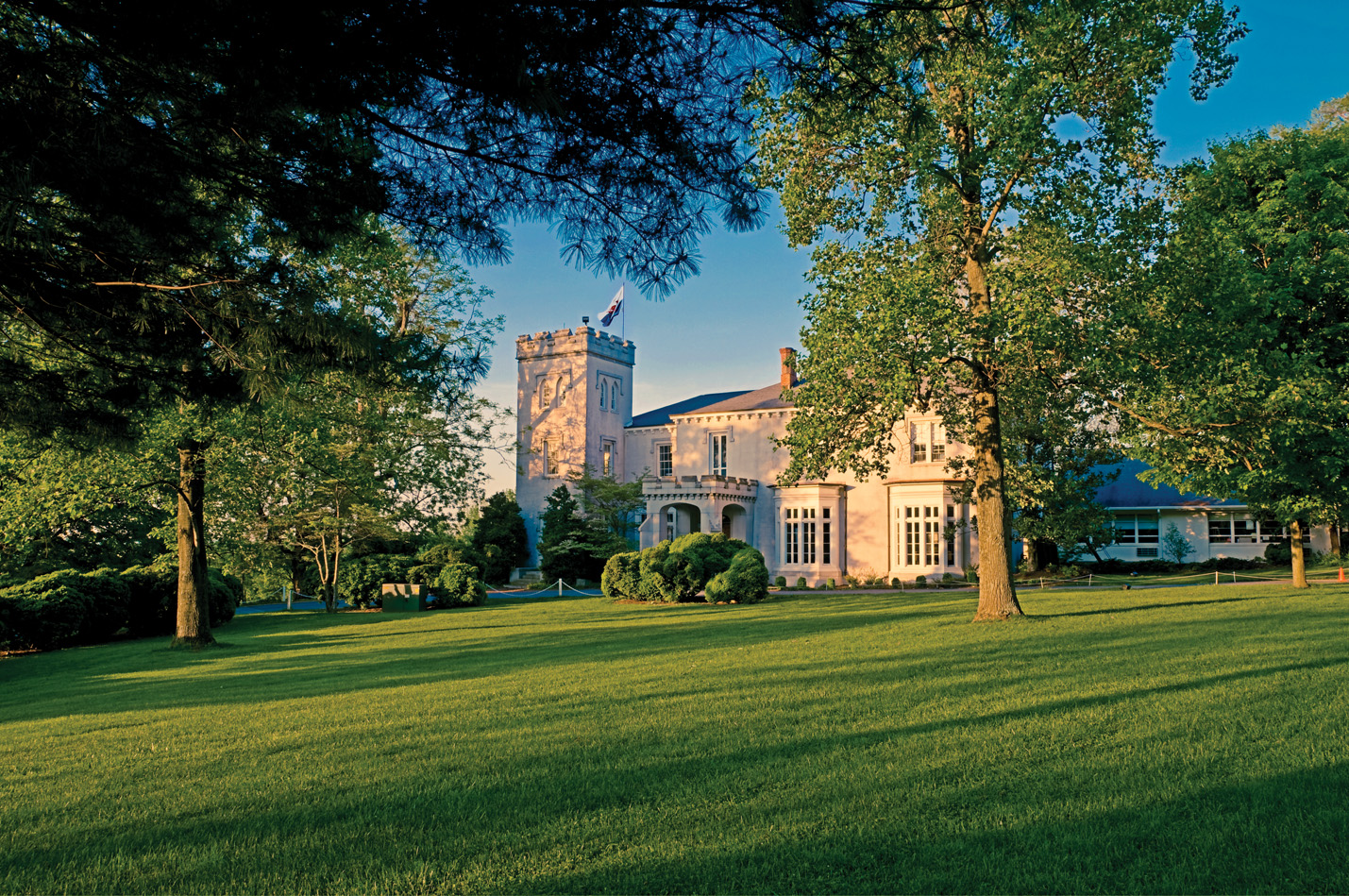
Glenelg Manor House, Front View

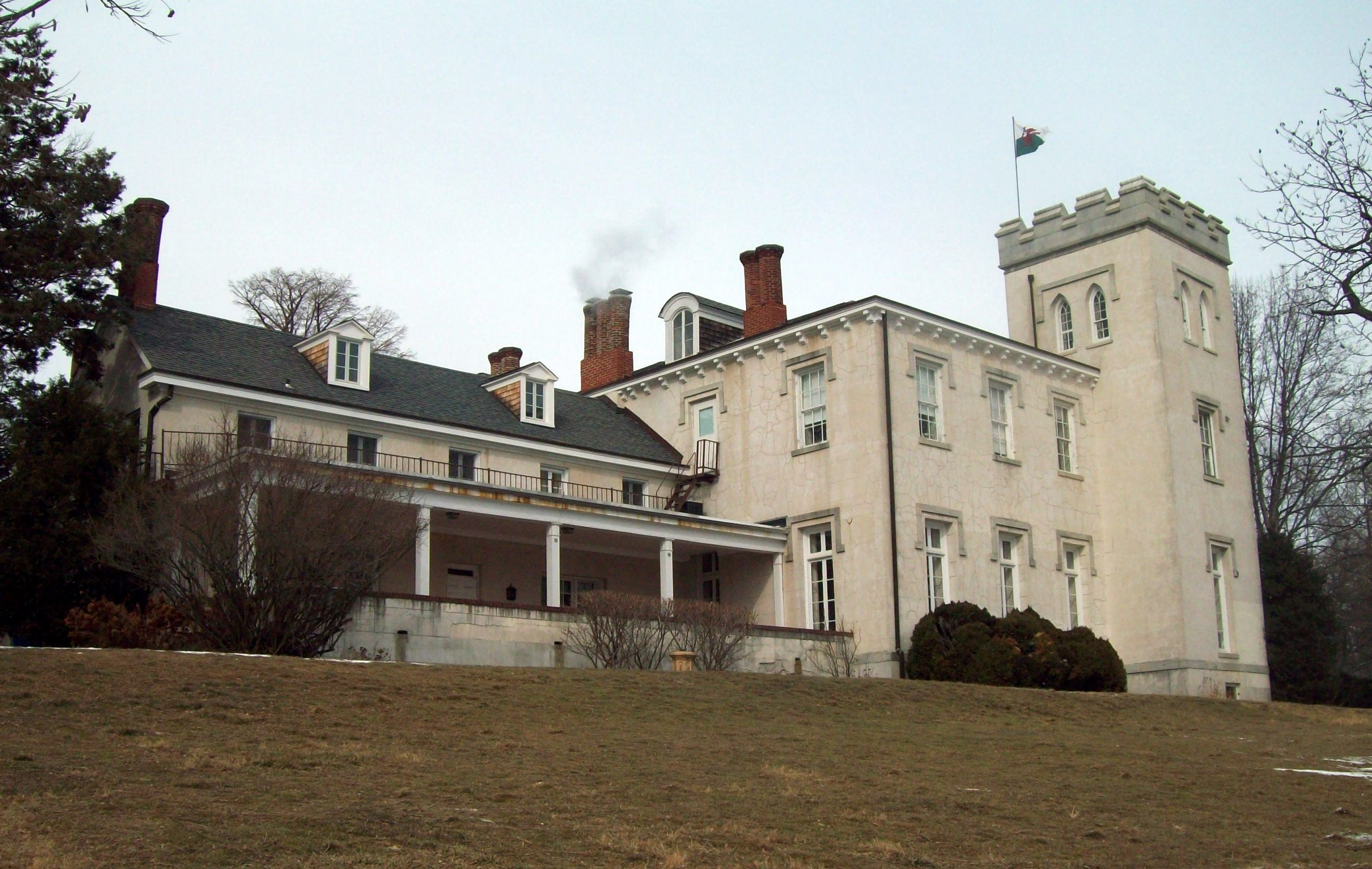
Glenelg Manor, Rear View, January 2011 showing the original house on the left and the Tudor style addition on the right

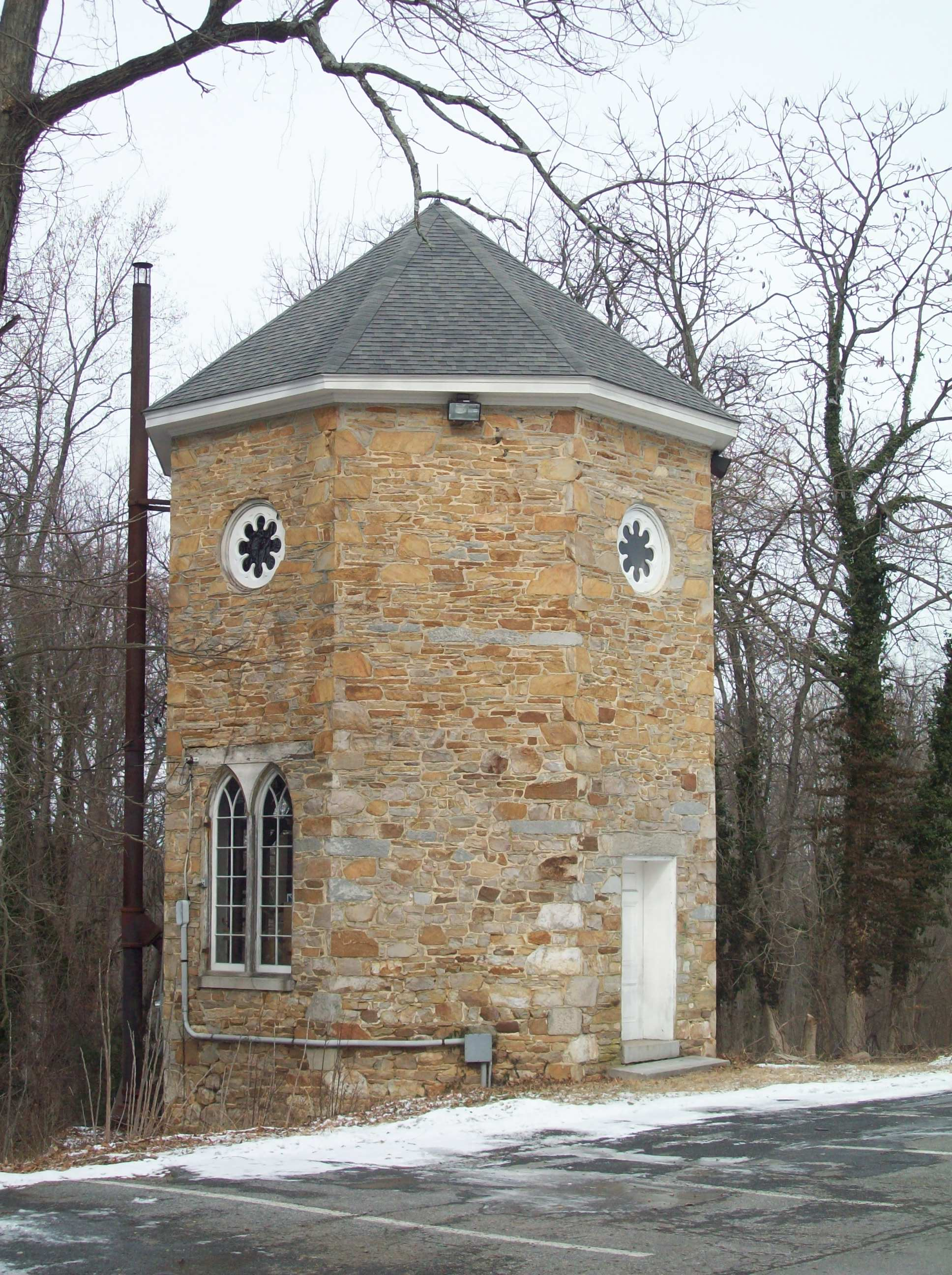
Glenelg Manor, Tower, January 2011

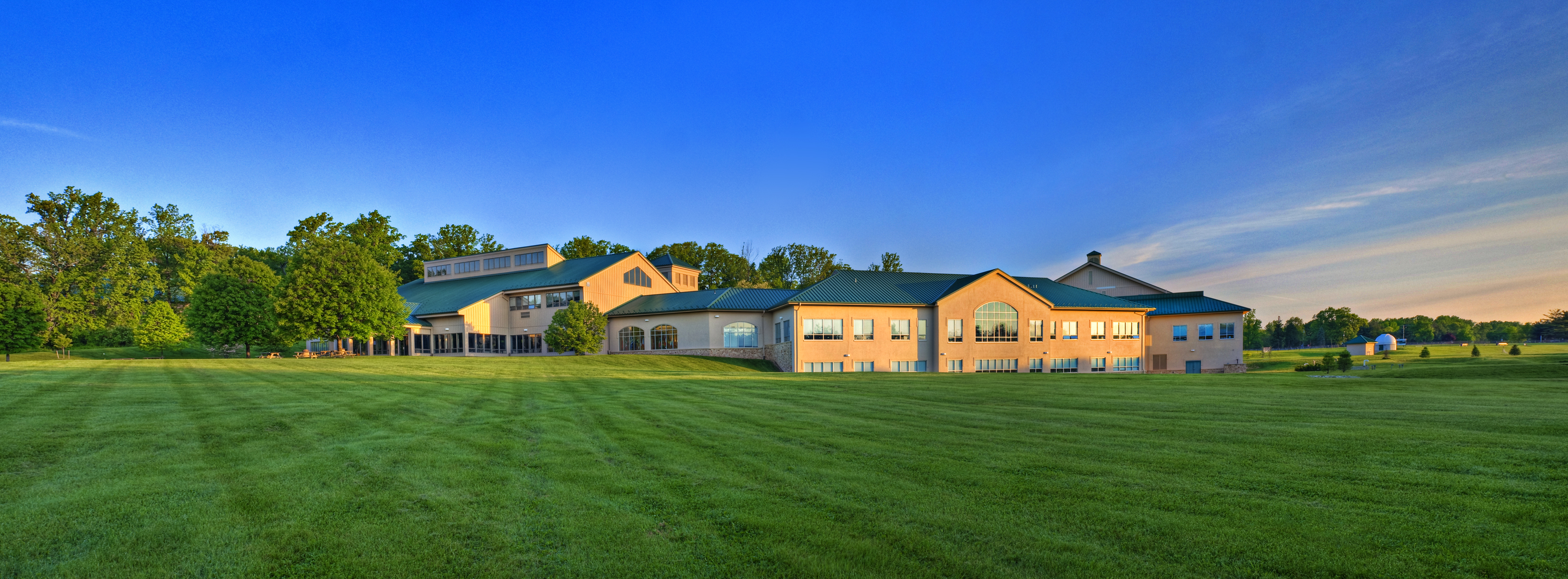
Upper School, Glenelg Country School

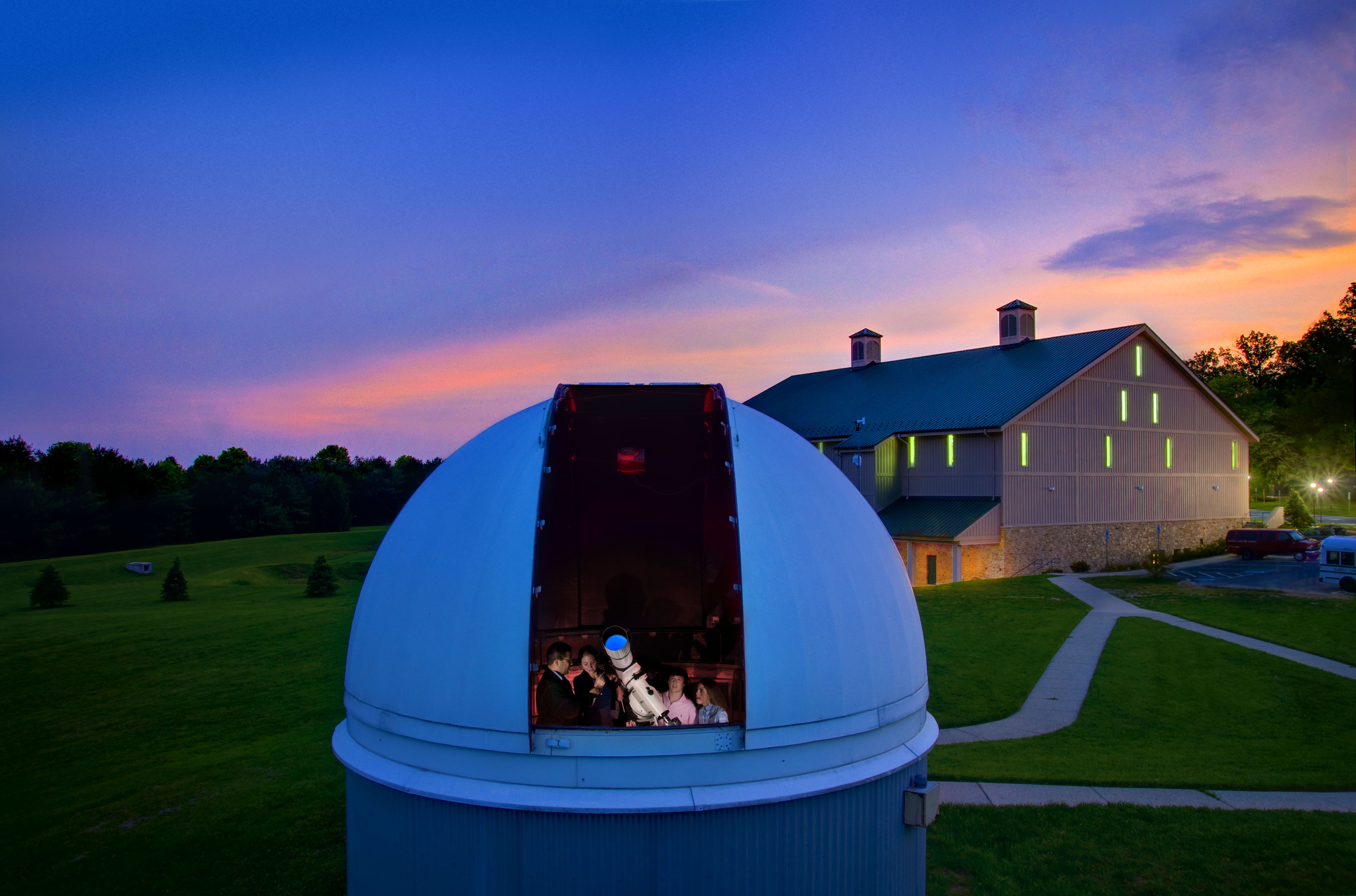
The Gould Observatory, Glenelg Country School. It houses an EDF Refractor Telescope.

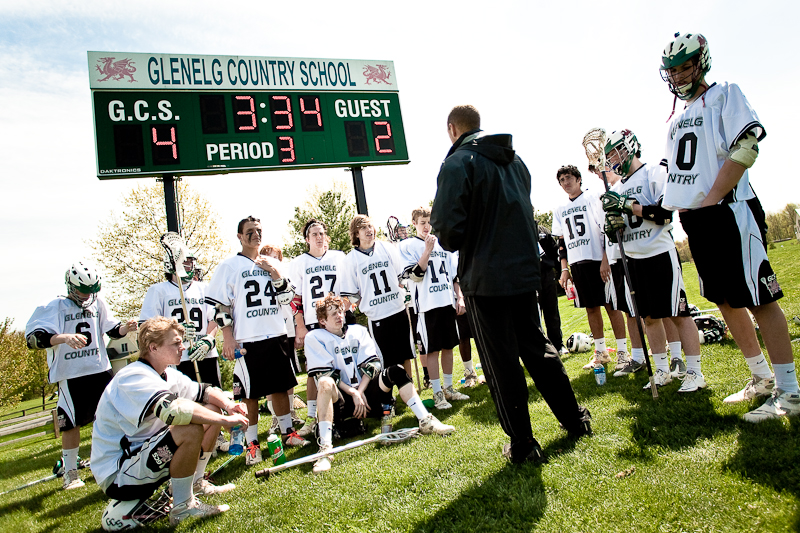
Varsity Boys Lacrosse, Glenelg Country School

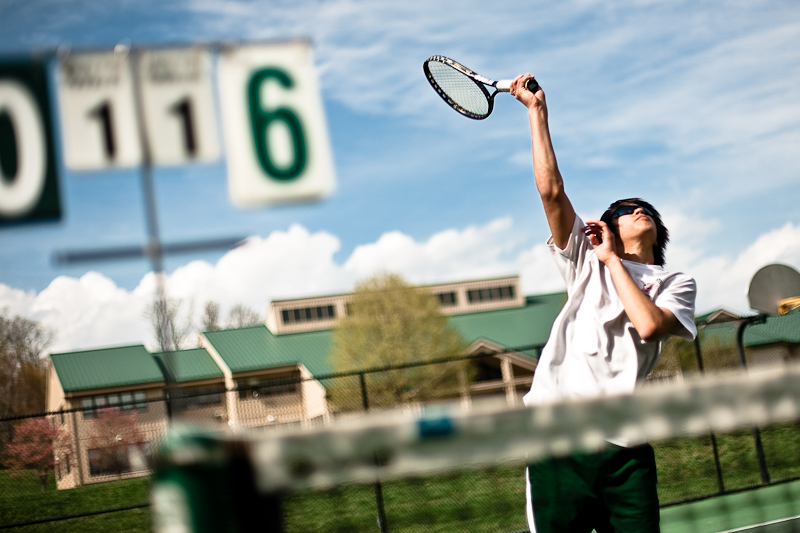
Varsity Boys Tennis, Glenelg Country School

== See also ==
- List of Howard County properties in the Maryland Historical Trust
