= Brian Basset =

American cartoonist

- Born: Brian Basset; November 30, 1957 (age 68) Norwalk, Connecticut, U.S.
- Area: Cartoonist
- Notable works: Adam@home and Red and Rover
- Awards: National Cartoonists Society Award, 2012

Brian Basset is an American comic strip artist (Red and Rover). Previously, he worked as an editorial cartoonist for the Seattle Times from 1978 to 1994, as well as being the creator and artist behind the syndicated comic strip Adam, later changed to Adam@home (1984–2009).

== Early years ==
Basset was born in Norwalk, Connecticut on November 30, 1957. His father. Gene Basset, was a sports, theatrical and political cartoonist for over 40 years, retiring in 1993. His mother was a mental health administrator. He has one brother and one sister.

Basset attended Langley High School in McLean, Virginia where he was a political cartoonist for the schoolpaper The Saxon Scope from 1974 to 1975.

In 1975, Basset enrolled at the Ohio State University where he drew editorial cartoons for the school newspaper, The Lantern, from 1975 to 1978. There, he attended the Fine Arts program.

== The Seattle Times Years ==
After university, he landed a 16-year stint at the Seattle Times, where he drew editorial cartoons for the newspaper. It was during this career when he developed the comic strip "Adam" (later known as Adam@Home or Adam at Home). It was first syndicated in 1984 and focused on the life of Adam Newman, who Basset has admitted has eerie resemblances to his real-life self.

In 1994, Basset was laid off by the Seattle Times during a period of downsizing.

== Adam@Home ==
Following his layoff at the Seattle Times, Basset became a full-time Work-From-Home Dad and his comic strip reflected this changing reality as Adam Newman went from Stay-At-Home Dad to harried home-office worker.

In 1995, this change was noticeable as the comic's name became "Adam@Home".

Beginning with the February 23, 2009 strip, Basset handed over responsibilities for Adam@home to Rob Harrell, former comic strip artist of Big Top. Basset drew almost a month's worth of Sunday strips after that, with Harrell's first Sunday strip appearing on March 22, 2009.

== Red and Rover ==
In 1998, Basset began thinking about producing a second comic strip that had a more childlike quality to it. On Sunday May 7, 2000, Red and Rover appeared in newspapers for the first time. Red and Rover is a retro-feel comic strip about the unconditional love between a dog and his boy that captures the spirit and flavor of the early-1960s-to-mid-1970s. It is auto-biographical in nature. Originally distributed for the first ten years by The Washington Post Writers Group, Red and Rover is currently syndicated to over 200 papers by Universal Uclick. In March, 2013, Brian Basset and Red and Rover were nominated for the third time (2003 and 2010 previously) for work done in 2012 by the National Cartoonists Society for Best Newspaper Comic Strip of the Year. On 25.May 2013, Red and Rover received the Award for Best Newspaper Comic Strip by the National Cartoonists Society at the 67th Annual Reuben Awards held in Pittsburgh, PA.

== NASA ==
In February, 2005, an exhibition of Basset's Red and Rover space-themed strips was held at NASA headquarters in Washington, D.C. - the first comic strip artist so honored. On July 26, 2005, an original drawing Basset had done for NASA celebrating the "Return to Flight" was carried aboard STS-114 Discovery following the Space Shuttle Columbia disaster 29 months earlier. In early 2011, Basset was asked by NASA to design and draw a poster commemorating 30-years of the Space Shuttle program, which came to an end with the safe predawn landing of Shuttle Atlantis on July 21, 2011.

== Film and television ==
In 2021, Basset joined forces with author and filmmaker William Holmgren to establish Rocket Hound Films, a film production company where he and Holmgren are creators, writers and producers. Together they also serve as executives and co-founders.

== Personal life ==
Basset lives and works in Edmonds, Washington. Besides cartooning, Basset is actively engaged in animal shelter charity work.

He is married to Bobbi Robinson and is the father of two grown sons, two grown step-daughters, and one grown step-son.
