= Kafui Dzirasa =

American psychiatrist and academic

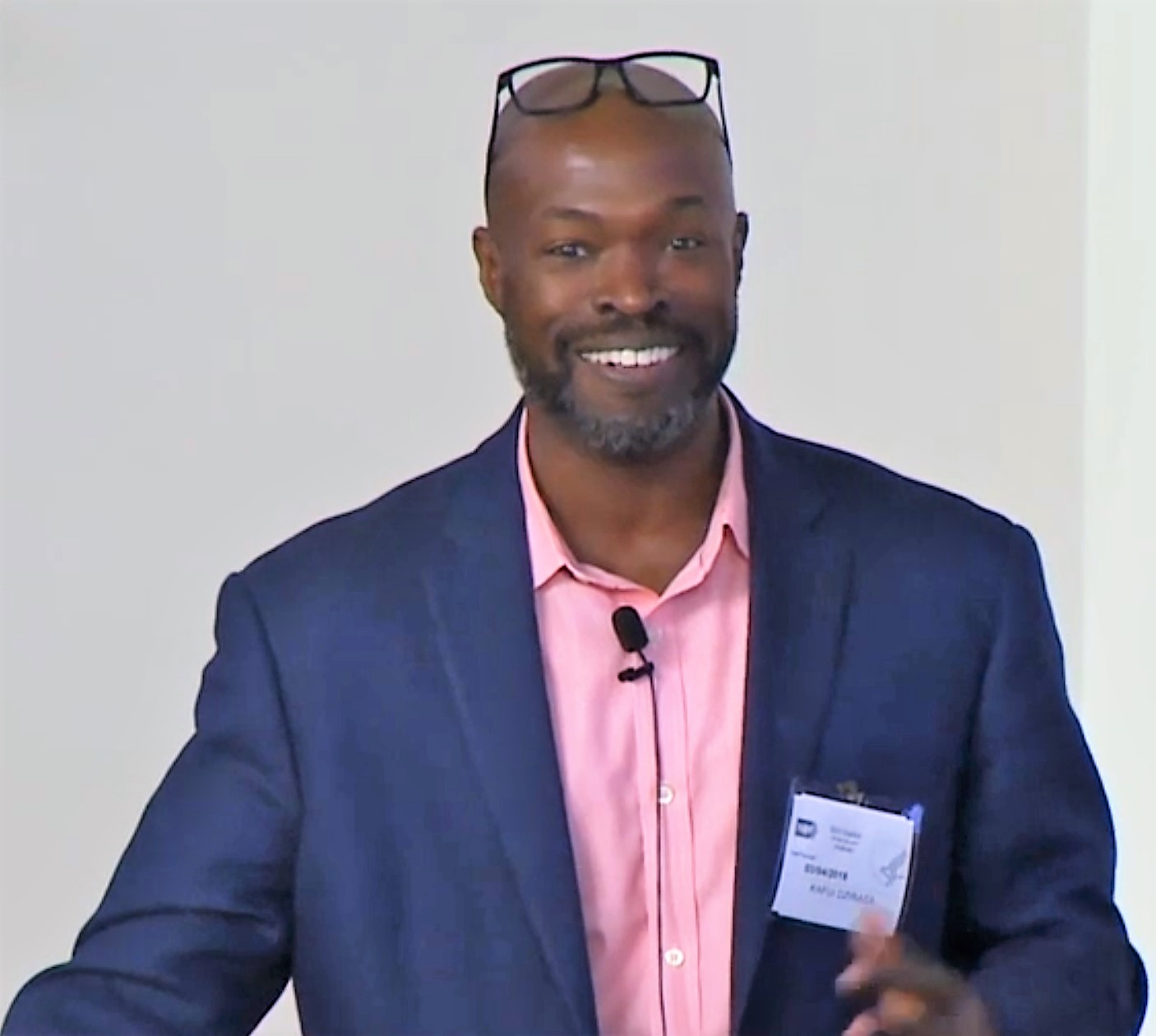
- Kafui Dzirasa delivering a 2019 National Institutes of Health lecture
- Education: University of Maryland, Baltimore County; Duke University
- Awards: PECASE (2016); Benjamin Franklin NextGen Award (2022)
- Scientific career
- Workplaces: Duke University
- Website: https://www.neuro.duke.edu/research/faculty-labs/dzirasa-lab

Kafui Dzirasa (born 1978) is an American psychiatrist and Associate Professor at Duke University. He looks to understand the relationship between neural circuit malfunction and mental illness. He was a 2019 AAAS Leshner Fellow and was elected Fellow of the National Academy of Medicine in 2021.

== Early life and education ==
Dzirasa was born to Abigail, a nurse, and Samuel Dzirasa, a civil engineer. His parents were from Accra, Ghana, and moved to the United States in 1971. Dzirasa grew up in Silver Spring, Maryland. While he was in college he met one of his childhood heroes who specialized in brain science. He was an undergraduate student at the University of Maryland, Baltimore County, where he received a Meyerhoff Scholarship. He switched from chemistry to chemical engineering at UMBC. He graduated with a bachelor's degree in chemical engineering in 2001. He joined Duke University with the intention of completing a PhD in biological engineering and designing neuroprosthetics. After visiting the schizophrenia ward at Duke University, Dzirasa switched to medicine. He earned a PhD in neurobiology in 2007 with Miguel Nicolelis. He was awarded the Duke University Somjen Award for Outstanding Dissertation Thesis. He was the first Black student to graduate with a doctorate in neurobiology from Duke. He completed his MD in 2009. His graduate work was supported by the Ruth K. Broad Biomedical Research Fellowship, the UNCF-Merck Graduate Science Research Fellowship and the Wakeman Fellowship. He was inspired to focus on mental illness after watching his family members suffer from bipolar disorder and completed his residency training in psychiatry in 2016.

== Career ==
Dzirasa is interested in how mechanisms in neural circuits underpin emotional behavior. His ultimate aim is to use neuroelectrical stimulation to treat mental illness. He has considered the fluctuations of local field potential oscillations in the brain. Dzirasa developed a multi-circuit in vivo recording technique that can be used with selective modulation using designer drugs. He used machine learning to identify a spatiotemporal dynamic network that can predict depression. He has looked at how the electrical patterns in the brain impact of mice cope with stress; finding that mice who were more sensitive to stress had higher activation in their prefrontal cortex compared to the less sensitive mice. He demonstrated that the network is distinct biologically from the networks that are dysfunctional after stress.

His work was featured on CBS in 2011. He is a Professor at Duke University, where he served on the advisory committee of the National Institutes of Health BRAIN Initiative. In 2016 Dzirasa was awarded the PECASE for his work on the interaction of genes under stress. He has also looked at the characterisation of sensorimotor gating in schizophrenic patients. His goal is to design a pacemaker for the brain that can regulate the electrical signals that underlie mental disorders.

=== Advocacy and academic service ===
Dzirasa delivered a TED talk at TEDMED, where he discussed curing mental disorders with electronic engineering. He spoke at the Aspen Ideas Festival about how to use technology to transform mental illness. He has also spoken at the National Academy of Medicine, Brain & Behavior Research Foundation, McLean Hospital and One Mind.

Dzirasa is interested in providing education about health to underserved communities. He is committed to improving diversity within the academic community, and founded the Association of Underrepresented Minority Fellows in 2007. He has served on the board of directors of the Student Medical Association, which looks to eradicate health disparities. He is a mentor for the Meyerhoff Scholarship Program. Dzirasa is committed to the undergraduate community at Duke University, and welcomes trainee students to his lab every year - in particular those from underrepresented groups.

=== Awards and honors ===
- 2021 Elected Fellow of the National Academy of Medicine
- 2019 AAAS Leshner Fellowship
- 2016 Presidential Early Career Award for Scientists and Engineers
- 2016 White House Frontiers Conference
- 2016 Duke Medical Alumni Emerging Leader Award
- 2013 Sidney Baer Prize for Schizophrenia Research
- 2011 International Mental Health Research Organization Rising Star Award
- 2008 Ebony magazine's 30 Young Leaders of the Future
- 2007 Charles Johnson Leadership Award
