= Critics and Awards Program for High School Students =

The Cappies (Critics and Awards Program) is an international program for recognizing, celebrating, and providing learning experiences for high school level theater and journalism students and teenage playwrights. The program prides itself on being a completely student-driven organization that gives a platform to teen voices.

There are currently 12 active Cappies programs in the U.S. and Canada, which range in size from five to 55 participating high school level institutions. Within each program, every participating school selects three to nine students for a critic team. After receiving training in theater criticism and review writing, they attend plays and musicals at other high schools in their area. They write reviews—of roughly 400 words—on a short turnaround deadline. Volunteer teacher-mentors lead discussions and select the critic-written reviews that are later published by regional newspapers and other publications, with student bylines.

== History ==
The Cappies began in 1999, in response to the Columbine tragedy, as an effort to bring more positive attention to teenagers engaged in creative pursuits. Capitol Steps founder Bill Strauss approached Fairfax County, Virginia public school administrator Judy Bowns, and together they developed the plan for the program. The program began in Fairfax and immediately became popular among high school drama departments in the area, growing from 14 schools in the fall of 1999 to 23 schools by that spring. The Cappies quickly spread to encompass the entire metro Washington, D.C., area. The Washington Post and several other local papers published student-written reviews, often with photographs (they have since ceased this activity, but instead now post these reviews online in a section entitled "Tomorrow's Critics"). As a result, the Cappies became a showcase for local theater and journalism talent, with over 50 schools around Washington, the largest Cappies region. Since 2002, it has operated nationwide, with new regional groups appearing yearly.

== Organization and process ==
To start a Cappies program, one must organize a small local meeting with students, parents, and teachers. Four schools must participate for the application to be approved. A steering committee—including a Program director, chair, treasurer, and at least two other members—is formed, and a charter application must be applied for. While waiting for approval, one should find local newspapers/media outlets that are willing to publish 1-2 reviews on a weekly basis. Once approved, a $300 annual application fee must be paid to Cappies, plus a $5–10 per-critic fee that is assessed in November based on critic training sessions and enrollments in the online information services. Each regional steering committee determines the per-school fee requirements.

Each regional program has a steering committee, with a charter from The Cappies. These are volunteers who oversee the work done by critics and teacher-mentors (who are also volunteers), and who then produce the Cappies Gala.

Participating schools select one show (a play or a musical) as their Cappies show. Some smaller Cappies programs allow schools to select two shows. The schools also select teachers to be mentors, who supervise the student critics and help maintain the integrity of the review-writing process. Before the season begins, the mentors and critics receive training from Cappies officials and are often aided by local journalists.

On the night of a Cappies show, the critics arrive early, attend the performance, and hold private discussions beforehand, during intermission, and after the show. During the post-show discussion, the discussion room decides on a Critics' Choice in each performing category, noting what will be up for competition in each category for the show's school. After returning home, each critic writes a review for the show and submits it to the centralized critic website, Cappies Information Systems (CIS). The mentors select the reviews they consider the most honest, objective, and best-written, which are then forwarded to local newspapers, many of whom publish these reviews with student bylines.

At the conclusion of each season, all critics attend a mandatory voting session in which they select from the shows they viewed who should be nominated for and/or win a Cappie Award. After awards voting, each program then holds a Cappies Gala, akin to the Tony Awards, to present awards and celebrate the year's shows. Sometimes these galas are held at schools, and other times at major theater venues. The Cappies of the National Capital Area holds its gala in the Concert Hall of the Kennedy Center, the center's largest performance space. These galas are formal and generally include local VIP award presenters, along with performances of songs or scenes from nominated shows. They usually run from two-and-a-half to three hours, and some are televised.

=== Award Categories ===
- Critic (differs across chapters based on gender, grade, etc.)
- Critic Team
- Marketing and Publicity
- Sound
- Lighting
- Sets
- Costumes
- Hair and Make-Up
- Props
- Special Effects and/or Technologies
- Stage Management
- Stage Crew
- Orchestra
- Choreography
- Creativity
- Ensemble in a Play
- Ensemble in a Musical
- Featured Actor in a Female Role in a Play
- Featured Actor in a Male Role in a Play
- Featured Actor in a Female Role in a Musical
- Featured Actor in a Male Role in a Musical
- Dancer in a Female Role
- Dancer in a Male Role
- Vocalist in a Female Role
- Vocalist in a Male Role
- Comic Actor in a Female Role in a Play
- Comic Actor in a Male Role in a Play
- Comic Actor in a Female Role in a Musical
- Comic Actor in a Male Role in a Musical
- Supporting Actor in a Female Role in a Play
- Supporting Actor in a Male Role in a Play
- Supporting Actor in a Female Role in a Musical
- Supporting Actor in a Male Role in a Musical
- Lead Actor in a Female Role in a Play
- Lead Actor in a Male Role in a Play
- Lead Actor in a Female Role in a Musical
- Lead Actor in a Male Role in a Musical
- Song
- Play
- Musical

=== Active Chapters ===
- National Capital Area (The greater Washington, D.C., Maryland, and Virginia area.)
- Canada's Capital Cappies (Ottawa, Canada and its surrounding area.)
- Orange County Cappies (Orange County, CA and the surrounding areas.)
- Greater Philadelphia Cappies (The areas of Burlington, Camden, Gloucester, and Salem in New Jersey and Bucks, Chester, Delaware, Montgomery, and Philadelphia in Pennsylvania.)
- South Florida Cappies (The Florida counties of Broward and Palm Beach.)
- Cappies of Baltimore (The Maryland counties of Baltimore, Howard, Anne Arundel, and Carroll.)
- Greater Cincinnati Cappies (The greater area of Cincinnati, Ohio including Northern Kentucky.)
- Kansas City Cappies (The area 45 miles in any direction from downtown Kansas City, MO.)
- Cappies Niagara Ontario (The region of Southern Ontario.)
- Delaware Cappies (The state of Delaware.)
- Southern New Jersey Cappies (The NJ counties of Atlantic, Burlington, Camden, Cape May, Cumberland, Gloucester, and Salem.)
- Blue Ridge Cappies (All Loudoun, VA localities including Leesburg, Sterling, Ashburn, and Middleburg.)

=== Awards rules ===
At the end of the school year, within each program, critics who review the required minimum number of shows (usually five) become judges for Cappie nominations and awards. Except for critic awards (determined by a digital formula), all Cappie nominations and awards are decided by student critics.

The student critics gather to vote on CIS. This process is carefully supervised by adult proctors, and reviewed for accuracy by a trustee and auditor. Depending on the program, there can be anywhere from three to five nominees per award category. The nominees are announced shortly after the voting.

The outcome of all awards is determined by CIS, which was developed in 2002 by two high school students from Thomas Jefferson High School for Science and Technology in Alexandria, Virginia.

Awards are only given to high school students in grades 9–12. The amount of adult involvement in offstage work (building sets, sewing costumes, playing in orchestras, etc.) is strictly established in the rules. A Cappies show that has adults exceeding the allowed level of involvement is not eligible for that category, but is eligible for all other awards.

A steering committee of a regional Cappies program can, if it chooses, give a Special Award for Service to a high school student who gave exceptional help, either to the Cappies or to high school theater throughout his or her region.

== Cappies International Theater ==
Every summer, winners of Lead Actor and Actress awards from all programs are invited to attend the Cappies International Theater. This CIT company presents three shows, all written entirely by high school students: Starz! (monologues, songs, and minimusicals), Playz! (short plays), and a full-length student-written musical. The latter two are performed at the Kennedy Center Theater Lab.

The Cappies International Theater is a summer program focused on the development of dramatic and musical skills. They produce several shows in different categories, and often perform the work of their peers. Students interested in the technical elements of theater also have opportunities to practice and demonstrate their skills.

Cappies International Theater began in the summer of 2002 at a small theater in Hollywood. In 2003, in partnership with the Kennedy Center, it moved to Washington, D.C., under the name Cappies National Theater. When the first Canadian program (in Ottawa) joined the Cappies in 2005, the name was changed to Cappies International Theater. Starting in 2006, CIT began featuring works by high school student playwrights, including the two full-length musicals Edit:Undo and Senioritis. Both were written by nine-person creative teams of student book writers, lyricists, composers, and a digital artist.

=== Student-written musicals ===
In 2006, CIT presented the student-written musical Edit:Undo, which is about teenage life and relationships in the digital era. A CD and DVD of Edit:Undo are available for sale on the website.

In 2007, the CIT company presented the student-written musical Senioritis, which is about the anxieties of senior year. A CD and feature-length film was to be made of Senioritis, following the Kennedy Center performances.

In 2008, the Cappies entered into a licensing agreement with the school's musical publisher Next Gen Publications, to represent Edit:Undo, Senioritis, Free-the-Music.com and founder Strauss' Makiddo worldwide.

The Cappies International Theater has not taken place since 2009, but may resume in the future.

== See also ==
- Canada's Capital Cappies (Ottawa, Canada)
- National Pacemaker Awards (high school and college)
- Senioritis
