= Red and Rover =

Comic strip

- Author: Brian Basset
- Website: GoComics.com/RedAndRover
- Current status/schedule: Ongoing daily
- Launch date: May 7, 2000; 25 years ago
- Syndicate(s): Universal Uclick/Andrews McMeel Syndication (2010–present); The Washington Post Writers Group (2000–2010)

Red and Rover (often styled Red & Rover) is a daily syndicated comic strip by Brian Basset that debuted in 2000. Semi-autobiographical in nature as a reflection of artist Brian Basset's childhood, Red & Rover is a retro-feel comic strip about the unconditional love between a boy and his dog that captures the spirit and flavor of the early-1960s to mid-1970s.

Red and Rover has been nominated four times for Best Newspaper Comic Strip. In 2013, Red and Rover received the Reuben Award for Best Newspaper Comic Strip by the National Cartoonists Society. On Sunday, May 7, 2000, Red and Rover appeared in newspapers for the first time.

== Publication history ==
Basset had been producing the comic strip Adam (now known as Adam@home) since 1984. In 1998, he began thinking about producing a second comic strip that had a more childlike quality to it.

In 2009, after nearly 25 years of drawing Adam@home, Basset decided to focus squarely on Red and Rover and he handed over the illustration duties of the older strip to Big Top artist Rob Harrell.

Originally syndicated for the first ten years by The Washington Post Writers Group, Red and Rover is currently syndicated to over 200 papers by Andrews McMeel Syndication.

Red and Rover comic strips have been compiled in three paperback collections, all by Andrews McMeel Publishing: "A Boy, A Dog, A Time, A Feeling" (2002) features the iconic "first meeting" between Red and his guardian angel dog Rover. "Waggin' Tales" (2004) continues their adventures, including Red's dream of becoming a NASA astronaut. "Red and Rover: Fun's Never Over" (2022) is a full-color collection of their ongoing escapades and friendship.

== Characters and story ==
Red and Rover is usually set around the end of the 1960s or the beginning of the 1970s, although a strip from November 20, 2009, depicted a car which bears a striking resemblance to a mid-1970s Ford Country Squire station wagon, and in a Sunday strip from August 28, 2011 Red plays a parody of Jaws, a film from 1975.

Red (real name Russell James McLean) is a 10-year-old boy who dreams of going into space one day as a NASA astronaut. He enjoys model rocketry, baseball, reading comic books, and other pastimes associated with boys his age. He loves Rover, his dog. Red can understand what Rover is thinking. This trope is used most famously in Charles M. Schulz 's Peanuts, where the bird Woodstock and sometimes even Charlie Brown can similarly read Snoopy's thoughts. Red is easygoing and even-tempered, content with his life and having a simple outlook towards the world around him. His carefree childhood days are marked by the usual woes of school, as well as exploring nature, napping in the shade of a large tree during summer vacation, chasing Popsicle Pete's ice cream truck, playing "fetch" with Rover, delivering newspapers, and imagining space exploration in a cardboard box rocket with co-astronaut Rover. Red mostly wears T-shirts with blue jeans and sneakers, but tends to go barefoot during the summer. He is drawn with exaggerated large eyes, similar to his parents' eyes. He is optimistic, curious, kind, friendly, adventurous - the quintessential all-American boy of that era.

Rover is a dog of mixed breed, with mostly Lab. Rover is an enthusiastic partner in Red's adventures and is very loyal to his boy. Red and Rover met when Rover rescued Red from being hit by a truck, earning the title of "guardian angel dog." Red adopted the homeless dog and they have been together ever since. The two have a telepathic communication, occasionally adjusting their "radars" to tune in to one another's thoughts. Rover likes to play fetch and chase squirrels. In a classic strip published on Mother's Day (May 13, 2012), Rover is sad because he doesn't remember much about his own mother. Red responds that Rover's Mom was "loving, kind, loyal, wise, perceptive, dependable, nurturing, funny and fun" - noting that these are attributes that she had passed on to her pup Rover. On March 16, 2010, Rover revealed that his grandfather, "Merganser McIntire," was a Chesapeake Bay Retriever and his grandmother, "Codfish Kate," was part Portuguese Water Dog.

Martin McLean is Red's 17-year-old brother, who is rarely seen in the strip. Martin's bedroom is off-limits to Red, who occasionally sneaks in to read his brother's comic books. Martin likes the Rolling Stones. He has bangs that cover his eyes most of the time. He has a girlfriend; Red can be seen either listening in on phone conversations or spying on Martin when she comes over. Martin seems to think of Red as a lower form of life, and frequently torments him.

Carol McLean is Red's mother. She is a homemaker who indulges her son's hobbies and interests. Carol is known for her good fudge and kindness to Rover.

Charlie McLean is Red's father. He is an aerospace engineer who encourages Red's interest in space exploration. He enjoys bowling and barbecuing. He had a brother named Jimmy who was killed in action during the Vietnam War. Red and Rover place a flag on Uncle Jimmy's grave on nearly every Memorial Day. (Red's middle name "James," originally mentioned on June 17, 2025, is a tribute to his Uncle Jimmy.)

Ruby is Red's classmate and his first crush (besides Marcia Brady). Red's crush is first hinted in the May 20, 2024, strip; readers meet Ruby for the first time on June 19, although the colorist accidentally gives her blond hair instead of the red hair Brian Basset intended (and which readers see later).

The Mintz Twins are Red's neighbors (sometimes referred to as the Double Mintz Twins). Their mother calls Red's mother occasionally on hot summer afternoons to ask permission for the girls to join Red and Rover in their backyard inflatable pool. Rover is usually more excited about the girls' visit than Red, who is concerned that they will contaminate his pool with "girl cooties."

Zeke and Reuben are two dogs that live in the neighborhood. Reuben is a long-haired chihuahua who sits on top of Zeke's head. Zeke, a large bulldog, always has a tennis ball in his mouth.
