= Adam@home =

Comic strip

- Brian Bassett's Adam@home (December 21, 2008)
- Author: Brian Basset
- Illustrator(s): Brian Basset (1984–2009); Rob Harrell (2009–present)
- Website: GoComics.com/AdamAtHome
- Current status/schedule: ongoing, daily
- Launch date: 1984; 42 years ago
- Alternate name: Adam
- Syndicate: Universal Press Syndicate/Universal Uclick/Andrews McMeel Syndication
- Genre(s): Humor, technology, workplace, family

Adam@home (previously titled Adam) is an American syndicated gag-a-day comic strip created by Brian Basset and currently drawn by Rob Harrell. Started in 1984, it follows the life of Adam Newman, a stay-at-home dad, as he juggles his family and career. Originally focusing on office-place humor, the comic's tone shifted when Adam became a stay-at-home consultant.

== Publication history ==
Basset drew the daily strip from its inception until February 21, 2009, when he decided to focus on his other daily strip, Red and Rover. Since February 23, 2009 Harrell, formerly of Big Top, has drawn Adam@Home. Strips drawn by Basset continued to appear on Sundays until March 15, 2009, with Harrell's first Sunday strip appearing the following week. Basset is still credited as the artist in many papers and in some of the Sunday strips' title boxes.

== Characters and story ==
Adam Newman
Adam Newman is a stay-at-home dad. He is self-employed, running Adam Newman Enterprises from his home computer. A caffeine addict, he spends his days at his computer, occasionally slacking or using his baby son Nick as an office assistant. He dreads summertime when his older children will be home tearing up the house and begging him to take them out. When not at home, Adam is usually at his favorite coffee shop, typing away at his laptop. He single-handedly keeps practically everyone in his neighborhood in business, especially the baristas.

Laura Newman
Laura is Adam's wife and works at a bookstore. She is Adam's salvation each day when she comes home from work to take the kids off his hands. She is astonished at how addicted he is to channel surfing and coffee shop fare: "one espresso addict in the family is expensive enough," she warns Clayton.

Clayton and Katy Newman
Clayton and Katy are Adam and Laura's elementary school children; Clayton is eight years old and Katy is six years old. Clayton, mischievous and energetic, takes great joy out of tormenting his little sister (and sometimes vice versa). Together, they enjoy bugging their dad to do things with them or break up their constant (and noisy) arguing, much to his annoyance when he's trying to get some work done.

Nick Newman
Nick is Adam and Laura's baby son. An energetic but not always happy kid, he keeps his dad company and serves as an occasional assistant to Adam, sometimes as a paperweight or an answering machine.

== Andy Van Hellemond ==
Former National Hockey League referee Andy Van Hellemond served the creators of Adam@home with a notice of intention to sue for libel over a comic which used the word "evil" in referring to Van Hellemond as "the worst and most evil ref ever". Newspapers carrying the strip on May 28, 2011 were also served, such as the Toronto Star and The Boston Globe. The Toronto Star published an opinion acknowledging the strip's content as a "cheap shot" and unfair to Van Hellemond, who had not officiated since 15 years prior and had a reputation for fairness.

== Sources ==
- Strickler, Dave. Syndicated Comic Strips and Artists, 1924-1995: The Complete Index. Cambria, California: Comics Access, 1995. ISBN 0-9700077-0-1
