= Sadie Collective =

Washington D.C.-based organization

- Formation: 2018; 8 years ago
- Location: Washington, D.C., U.S.
- Founders: Anna Gifty Opoku-Agyeman; Fanta Traore
- Website: sadiecollective.org

The Sadie Collective is the first American non-profit organization which aims to increase the representation of African-American women in economics and related fields. It was founded by Anna Gifty Opoku-Agyeman and Fanta Traore in August 2018 and is named for the first African-American economist, Sadie T. M. Alexander.

It has organized conferences connecting African-American women pursuing careers in economics and related fields such as finance, data science, and public policy. In February 2019, the Collective hosted the Sadie T. M. Alexander Conference for Economics and related fields at Mathematica Policy Research in Washington, D.C. In February 2020, the second annual conference was hosted by the Urban Institute with Bridget Terry Long and Janet Yellen as Keynote Speakers with nearly 300 attendees. The conferences are the first exclusively for African-American women in economics and related fields. In 2020, the Chicago Federal Reserve Bank announced a data science skills workshop in collaboration with the Collective for African-American college students.

== History ==
Anna Gifty Opoku-Agyeman, a former undergraduate student at the University of Maryland, Baltimore County, and Fanta Traore, a former research assistant at the Federal Reserve Board of Governors co-founded the organization in August 2018. Both women cited their isolating experiences in their work and academic environments as inspiration for creating an "intergenerational community" of Black women in economics and related fields. Both women mention that Lisa Cook is their mentor and an early supporter of the Collective. Anna Gifty Opoku-Agyeman and Lisa Cook co-wrote a New York Times opinion piece and participated in interviews specifically advocating especially for the inclusion and advancement of African-American women in the economics profession.

Opoku-Agyeman served as the organization's CEO until her resignation in March 2021. Traore served as CEO shortly after. In July 2022, Bola Olaniyan was announced as the Collective's first Executive Director.

== Funding ==
In October 2020, the organization entered a multi-year partnership with the Bill & Melinda Gates Foundation. In 2021, the organization was listed among several organizations awarded the first round of capital investments and philanthropic grants for Black women by Goldman Sachs to "fund the creation of high school economic clubs for young Black girls to participate in the annual Federal Reserve Challenge".

== See also ==
- National Economic Association
- The Research in Color Foundation
