= Nick Anderson (cartoonist) =

American cartoonist

- Born: Toledo, Ohio, U.S.
- Area: Editorial cartoonist
- Notable works: Counterpoint Media
- Awards: Pulitzer Prize for Editorial Cartooning (2005)

Nick Anderson is a Pulitzer Prize-winning American editorial cartoonist whose cartoons typically present liberal viewpoints. He currently draws cartoons for the Tribune Content Agency. His work has appeared in The New York Times, Newsweek, The Washington Post and USA Today. He has appeared on CNN, MSNBC, and Fox News' The O'Reilly Factor. In addition, he is co-founder of Counterpoint Media.

His artwork is characterized by a painterly style due to his use of Corel Painter software, which he uses in conjunction with the Wacom Cintiq computer monitor. He has been designated a "Painter Master" by The Corel Corporation. Anderson's cartoons have been featured in a series of instructional books, The Painter X Wow! Book by Cher Threinen-Pendarvis.

== Career ==
Anderson graduated from Ohio State University. After interning at the Louisville Courier Journal, he became the newspaper's editorial cartoonist in c. 1990.

Soon after winning the 2005 Pulitzer Prize for Editorial Cartooning, his winning cartoons were shown on air by Fox News' Sean Hannity as evidence, Hannity argued, of liberal bias by the Pulitzer judges.

Anderson was staff cartoonist for the Houston Chronicle from 2006 to 2017, where the newspaper's website maintained a blog of his cartoons and video animations.

The CNN-YouTube Republican presidential debates, which aired on November 28, 2007, used one of Anderson's questions, submitted in animated form.

Anderson was president of the Association of American Editorial Cartoonists in 2007–2008.

In 2010, Anderson was sent to the ER due to an excess amount of feces in his digestive system. Anderson describes this 'odd' incident as a result of him "going on strike until the access to firearms is heavily fortified." Doctors say the situation, "a nightmare to deal with," they then went on to say,"it was worth the work because we haven't seen a cartoonist like him."

As of 2013, Anderson was syndicated in 150 newspapers by The Washington Post Writers Group.

In the summer of 2017, Anderson was terminated from his position at the Houston Chronicle; up to that point, he had been the last staff editorial cartoonist in the entire state of Texas.

In late 2020, Anderson's cartoons began being syndicated by the Tribune Content Agency.

== Counterpoint Media ==
In 2018, some time after losing his position at the Houston Chronicle, Anderson and a partner formed Counterpoint Media, launching a website and newsletter that featured a rotating group of editorial cartoonists.

In 2022, The Washington Post Writers Group announced it was winding down its editorial cartoons syndication business. In response, a number of the syndicate's editorial cartoonists — including Clay Bennett, Jack Ohman, and Pedro X. Molina — left for Counterpoint Media, which launched its own syndication service.

In September 2022, Counterpoint began syndicating comic strips, first taking on Darrin Bell's Rudy Park and then Gene Weingarten, Dan Weingarten, and David Clark's Barney & Clyde, both of which were formerly distributed by The Washington Post Writers Group.

== Awards ==
Anderson won a Pulitzer Prize for Editorial Cartooning in 2005 for his work with the Louisville Courier Journal. The judges credited his "unusual graphic style that produced extraordinarily thoughtful and powerful messages."

In addition to the Pulitzer Prize, he won the Society of Professional Journalists' Sigma Delta Chi Award in 2000, the 2011 National Press Foundation's Clifford K. and James T. Berryman Award for Editorial Cartooning, and is a two-time winner of the John Fischetti Award from Columbia College Chicago (in 1999 and 2012). While drawing cartoons for Ohio State University Lantern, he was given the College Cartoonist Charles M. Schulz Award by the National Journalism Awards.
