= Brewster Rockit: Space Guy! =

American comic strip by Tim Rickard

- Author(s): Tim Rickard
- Website: Gocomics.com site
- Current status/schedule: Running
- Launch date: July 5, 2004
- Syndicate(s): Tribune Content Agency
- Publisher(s): Andrews McMeel Publishing
- Genre(s): Humor, Science Fiction, Satire

Brewster Rockit: Space Guy! is a satirical retro-futuristic comic strip created by Tim Rickard. It chronicles the misadventures of the dim-witted Brewster Rockit, captain of the space station R.U. Sirius, and his crew. Many of the comic's characters and elements are derived from the Star Trek franchise, American science fiction films of the 1950s, and science fiction comics of the 1940s and 1950s. It debuted on July 5, 2004, and is nationally syndicated by Tribune Content Agency.

The weekday strips usually feature extended serial storylines, often running several weeks at a time. The Sunday strips are stand-alone, self-contained gags which are often more elaborately illustrated and action-oriented than the dailies, and are sometimes presented in medias res style. The comic's humor includes satire, metahumor, slapstick, dark humor, running gags, word play, and puns.

== Plot ==
The R.U. Sirius is a space station orbiting Earth that acts as both an embassy for visiting aliens as well as a first line of defense against hostile aliens. Its mission statement is (probably) "Try not to die a horrible death." The comic's storylines are often obvious parodies of well-known science fiction and fantasy movies, television series, and books, as well as current events and contemporary pop culture, with Brewster and his crew typically coming out victorious over the countless evil villains they face.

== Main characters ==
- Captain Brewster Rockit: The lantern-jawed and squinty-eyed captain of the R.U. Sirius. He is brave, optimistic... and dumb as a rock. His strong leadership skills are complemented by a boyish sense of humor (and childlike mindset). He graduated from the Air Force Academy and then served in NASA as a Space Shuttle pilot. However, he failed his intelligence exam because he kept eating the pencils. He originally had the intelligence of an average person, but excessive memory wipes from alien abductions caused him to lose it. According to Pam, he has an obsession with ham.
- Lieutenant Pamela Mae Snap: The tough and pragmatic second-in-command aboard the R.U. Sirius, Pam is usually the one responsible for keeping things running, despite the collective idiocy of her shipmates. She sometimes has a hot temper and an attitude that gets her into trouble. She is also the mother of two young kids from a bad marriage that she doesn't talk about. She has shown to have a "thing" for bad boys, having dated Dirk Raider, Brewster's nemesis, as well as Karnor. She enjoys killing things--and eating Oreos.
- Dr. Mel Practice: The station's conniving science officer (and mad scientist, though he prefers the term, "sanity-challenged scientist"). He often creates monsters and machines (killbots), but inevitably fails in his plans to conquer the universe. One of his craziest inventions was a "Procrastination Ray", which sent troublesome objects into the future, so one would have no choice but to deal with them later. He is bald and wears a white lab coat, black gloves, and spectacles. Dr. Mell is based on Dr. Sivana of the Captain Marvel strips. He also sometimes acts as presenter for factual topics, such as the 2024 solar eclipse.
- Cliff Clewless: The station's engineer - a position for which he is completely unqualified. He got his position through his computer-hacking abilities by hacking into NASA's computer and upgrading himself from "programmer" to "engineer". He believes himself to be popular with the ladies. He is fat and is invariably shown sporting a cap and sunglasses.
- Winky: A bright-eyed but hapless child crew member and assistant to Dr. Mel. He is often stuck with the nastiest or most dangerous tasks. His resulting injuries commonly leave him uttering some variation of the phrase, "AHHHH! MY SPLEEN!" He also is quite often attacked by angry badgers, usually accidentally released by Dr. Mel. Revealed in a series of 2020 strips, Winky is actually a clone of one of the Ensign Kennys.

== Other characters ==
- Agent X: A mysterious government agent from the Department of the Paranormal. His job is to seek out the truth about aliens, then cover it up. The R.U. Sirius was his idea.
- Pal 8000: A computer creation of Dr. Mel who views him as a father figure. He regulates the station's life-support systems and is a bit immature, throwing juvenile tantrums when he doesn't get his way. He wants to participate in human activities such as baseball and biking—despite being a three-ton computer. A parody of HAL 9000 from 2001: A Space Odyssey.
- Bucky the Robot: A "robot" who, as is often pointed out by Pam and Dr. Mel in vain, is merely a "bucket on a coat rack!" Built by Cliff at the request of Brewster on the comic's second day, he sports an unvarying smiling face. He is a recipient of a worker of the year award for the R.U. Sirius. He also got the same score on the intelligence exam as Brewster. He once won an election against him to become captain, not to mention when he won the Presidential Galactic Election.
- Oldbot: An aging robot with a failing memory. Originally shaped as the B-9 Robot from Lost in Space, its appearance was changed due to legal liabilities.
- Dirk Raider: A parody of Darth Vader and commander of a planet-destroying "Death-Ship." His armor resembles that of a medieval knight. Once an apprentice of Brewster's in the order of "Goodguy Knights," Dirk is now his arch rival and member of the evil corporation "Microsith," which is currently known as "Numesis".
- Stormtroopers: Dirk Raider's army, they are parodies of Star Wars' stormtroopers. A recurring gag is their tendency to be poor shots; one missed shooting Brewster several times, even though he was trapped in a pit.
- Karnor: A visiting alien that has a bad habit of eating people. He is tall, green, and has a crush on Pam. He is king of the Zorgons.
- Cosmicus: A character that eats planets. A parody of the colossal entity Galactus, of Marvel Comics. He has also appeared in the comic strip Watch Your Head. He has a cousin named Morty.
- Philbert: Cliff's son, the result of Cliff's impregnation of an alien (reminiscent of the space creature in the Alien series). Philbert now lives somewhere in the air ducts.
- Ursula: A hairless female from Venus. She and Pam don't get along. She is a spy for Dirk Raider. Pam knows this but cannot convince the other crew members.
- Enigmo: An all-powerful, but gullible, purple floating head in space. His attempts to enslave Brewster and his crew often end up futile.
- Ensign Kenny: A name given to various extremely unlucky human crew members, who are constantly dying on missions. A parody both of the red-shirted security crewmen in the original Star Trek and of Kenny in South Park.
- Mosage: A 'wise alien' philosopher and a member of a race of Chameleons, who are supposed to be able to change their color to match their surroundings. However, they are not able to (which has led to near-extinction on their part).
- Toada: A parody of Yoda, this toad-faced alien dispenses wisdom to the crew of the R.U. Sirius while adding his own cynical twist to it. He is a master on the Good-guy Knights council.
- Ted the Observer: Leader of the Observers. A parody of Uatu the Watcher of Marvel comics.
- Marie and Albert: Pam's kids, often referenced but not seen until 2014. They have demonstrated themselves to be geniuses, such as the time when Marie deactivated the R. U. Sirius's self-destruct sequence, but they are irresponsible and often try Pam's nerves. Marie is especially mischievous while Albert is often depressed with how everything will end eventually.

== Races ==
- Humans: Residents of earth, whom Agent X is always trying to keep ignorant of the existence of aliens (despite alien attacks on New York and other major cities).
- Zomulans: Oblong-headed abductors from another planet. They once captured Brewster and put him in an arena with a very large crab-creature. They also bought Earth once and tried to repopulate it with giant space bears.
- Zorgons: Human-eating aliens of whom Karnor is the king. Agent X introduced 'I Can't Believe It's Not Humans', a non-violent food source to them, so that they would stop their carnivorous ways.
- Dorkons: Aliens who say, in reference to their "goofy outfits", "We may be light-years ahead of you in technology, but we're decades behind you in fashion." They tried to sell cookbooks of recipes using humans to the Zorgons.
- Donut People: A race of aliens shaped like donuts. They are edible. They come from Torus 8 as a reference to their shape. One of them is named "Duncan".
- Uranians: A race from Uranus who are always the "butt" of jokes (both in the figurative and literal sense, as most of the jokes relate to the butt, a fact that they are not happy about, especially O-Dor of Uranus).
- Saturnians: Inhabitants of Saturn who once won the moon in a blackjack game with Cliff.
- Insectoids: Insect-like aliens who consistently rotate between making war and peace on the R.U. Sirius.
- Observers: Ancient and wise aliens from Limbo who record all that goes on in the Universe.
- Space Squids: Cephalopod-like, green aliens with one eye in the middle of their foreheads who frequently attack the R.U. Sirius.

== First collection ==
A book of collected Brewster Rockit: Space Guy! comic strips was released on April 1, 2007 by Andrews McMeel Publishing, with the subtitle Close Encounters of the Worst Kind. It compiles roughly forty weeks of the strip, with all of them printed in full color. The featured storylines include parodies of the first Planet of the Apes, Star Wars, and Alien movies, and a combination of The Lord of the Rings and The Wizard of Oz. A foreword is provided by Stephan Pastis, creator of Pearls Before Swine. As of 2025 this is the only Brewster Rockit book collection.
