= The Style Invitational =

The Invitational, or Invite, formerly The Style Invitational, is a long-running humor contest that ran first in the Style section of the Sunday Washington Post before moving to Saturday's Style and later returning to the Sunday paper. Started in 1993, it has run weekly, except for a hiatus in late 1999. Its last publication date in the Post was December 11, 2022, before moving to Substack and being renamed "The Invitational".

In that time, it has had two head judges who select winning entries: "The Czar" and "The Empress." The Czar, who was anonymous, abdicated in late 2003, leaving the contest in the hands of his former associate, The Empress, copy editor Patricia (Pat) Myers. The humor ranges from an intellectual vein to a less mature style, and frequently touches on sophisticated political or historical allusions. While the contest theme changes every week, some popular contests are periodically repeated. The S.I. has a loyal following of self-proclaimed "Losers," who refer to having a contest entry published as "getting ink".

== History ==
The Style Invitational kicked off in March 1993 by asking readers to come up with a less offensive name for the Washington Redskins. The winner, published two weeks later, was Douglas R. Miller, with the entry "The Baltimore Redskins. No, don't move the team, just let Baltimore deal with it." He won a Timex watch like the one President Bill Clinton wore at the time, and apparently never entered again, as he wanted to retire undefeated.

The second week's contest was to replace the state of Maryland's slogan "Manly deeds, Womanly words" and yielded up such responses as "Maryland - Home to its residents" and winner "Maryland - Wait! We can explain!" by Oslo. He won an as yet unpurchased large kitschy crab sculpture/decoration, but traded it for a Timex watch like the one President Bill Clinton wore at the time. Another early contest asked entrants to help choose a better nickname for Washington, D.C., to replace "A Capital City". Exemplifying the S.I.'s irreverence, the winning entry was "A Work-Free Drug Place."

Each column is titled with its week number, beginning with Arabic numerals. In 2000 the numbering restarted at I using Roman numerals. In March 2003, for the 10th anniversary, the column continued numbering at 496, once again using Arabic numerals.

The contest had a several-month hiatus beginning in August 1999, and restarted in January 2000. It usually receives entries from hundreds of persons each week and, because up to 25 entries are allowed for each individual, has received upwards of 20,000 entries in a single week.

A group of devotees of the S.I. meets periodically in the Washington, D.C., area, and hosts an annual "Flushies" awards dinner that has attracted gameplayers from as far away as Ireland and California. The contest also gets entries from England, Scotland, Australia, and New Zealand. Further indicative of interest in the S.I. was a (now-defunct) Rotisserie League, in which players championed and won points for the successes of their favorite entrants. There has also been a contest newsletter, Depravda, begun by Elden Carnahan of Laurel, Md., and subsequently foisted off on another unsuspecting Loser. Once a proud monthly periodical, Depravda now appears only when editorial inertia can be overcome.

In August 2007, the contest was moved to the Style section of Saturday's Post when Sunday Style was shortened and combined with Arts. In early 2011, the Invitational returned to the Post's Sunday Style.

On December 1, 2022, the Post announced that the last day the column would run would be December 11. Any contests in progress that would have had winners published after that date would not appear. Although the Post received numerous letters to the editors complaining about the change, the final column did run on December 11 and was a celebration of past entries.

Several days later, it was announced on the S.I.'s Facebook Page, and Gene Weingarten's Twitter feed, that the S.I. would take up a new home on Substack, be renamed "The Invitational", and that the Czar and Empress would co-moderate it.

As of 2023, it is free to read, but users must subscribe at a rate of $50 per year to contribute. This subscription also allows the user to contribute to Gene's semi-weekly (Tuesdays and Thursdays) online chat, on his Substack page "The Gene Pool". It is run by Weingarten and Patricia Myers.

Numerous humorous lists passed around the Internet, usually misattributed, had their actual origin in the Style Invitational.

== Notable entrants ==
The most notable name in S.I. annals is Chuck Smith, of Woodbridge, Virginia, who first won in the contest's sixth week. His frequent successes inspired a contest solely to decide what to do about him. He won that contest, too.

Brendan Beary, of Great Mills, Md., was the 2005 chart topper, with 179 "inks". In 2006, he won a limerick contest between himself and Chris Doyle (see below).

Russell Beland, formerly of Springfield, Virginia now of Fairfax, Virginia, was the first Loser to reach 1,500 inks, a record he set in June 2011. He passed 1,000 in 2006, and earned the opportunity to judge a week of the contest. He has temporarily retired from the Invitational on several occasions, one of which prompted a contest to suggest an Invitational prize sufficient to lure him back. (One entry: "A night on the town with Mrs. Beland.")

Elden Carnahan, of Laurel, Maryland (aka Grace Fuller) tabulates running statistics on the contest that are available on the "Losers"' unofficial web site.

Chris Doyle, currently entering from Denton, Texas and earlier from various Internet cafes during dozens of overseas trips, is known for his wordplay, poetry and anagrams, and was a perennial winner in a similar past contest in New York magazine, from which the S.I. may have drawn its inspiration. He is the current all-time Invitational leader, the first entrant to amass over 2,000 inks, and is also the third-most prolific contributor to the Omnificent English Dictionary in Limerick Form (OEDILF). Many Style Invitational Losers have become OEDILF contributors (and vice versa) after the Invitational's Week 572 Contest.

Kevin Dopart, of Washington D.C., has been a frequent contributor to the contest. He became the fastest entrant ever and 4th overall to attain 1,000 inks, reaching that number in January 2014. He was the top-inking Loser in each year from 2006 through 2012.

Sarah Worcester Gaymon, of Gambrills, Maryland, is a former Jeopardy! champion, as is Mark Eckenwiler. John Holder, of Charlotte, N.C., and Matt Monitto, of Bristol, Connecticut, won on Wheel of Fortune.

Jennifer Hart, of Arlington, Va., has been a frequent winner and eclipsed Chuck Smith as all-time points leader during the years in which she actively participated.

Niels Hoven, originally from Silver Spring, appeared on the third season of Beauty and the Geek.

Frank Mann, of Washington, D.C., is the brother of singer Aimee Mann.

Joe Romm, of Washington D.C., was a frequent contributor from the contest's second year until a gradual decline in his participation from around 2006. His entries appeared 343 times, including 16 winning entries, and he was the first "Rookie of the Year". Among his submissions was the winning entry of what was later declared to be the best overall week's results of the Style Invitational's first decade. (A discarded first draft of some famous line: "We hold these truths to be, like, du-uuh.")

Ervin Stembol, of Alexandria, Va., has been an occasional winner in this and other humor contests. His unmasking as a nom de plume prompted the current contest rule barring pseudonymous entries.

Bob Staake (pronounced "Stack") illustrates the contest and occasionally suggests contest ideas.

Tom Witte, of Montgomery Village, Md., is a frequent winner and contest-namer. In 2009 he became the third person to amass 1,000 appearances.

== Czar/Empress ==
"The Czar of the Style Invitational" was, until December 2003, the pseudonymous man behind the contest. He chose all the winners - calling the contest the "last pure meritocracy on Earth" - and controlled all aspects of the contest. Very little was known about the Czar for some time, except that he worked for The Washington Post coming up with the contest ideas and choosing the winners for every week's contest. Post writer and humorist Gene Weingarten was believed to be the Czar despite public denials. However, in 1999, and again in 2001, he admitted in his column that he edited the feature. The Czar retired in late 2003, giving all the power to "The Empress of the Style Invitational", who has suggested she has a lower tolerance for immature or bathroom humor than the Czar.

In early 2011, with the Invitational's move to Sunday's Style section, the Empress was outed by the Post as former copy editor Pat Myers, whose real name appears in the byline. In the contest's discussion group, the Style Conversational, she still goes by "The Empress."

== Format ==
Each week's contest begins with a few examples of answers to the contest, which is confusing since they appear before the contest theme for the week is presented. There is often a picture or pictorial example. Sometimes the contest relates to a picture, such as one where entrants suggest what a given cartoon picture or group of pictures might represent. Beneath this is a paragraph beginning with the phrase "This week's contest," followed by a description of the contest. There is then fine print describing the prizes, how to enter, and how to determine if you are eligible for the prizes.

Following is the "Report from Week X," where X = [this week's contest number] - 4, the result of the four weeks between when a contest is first shown and the winners are announced. These results begin with commentary by The Empress on the results, entries that were too common to publish, funny but un-printable entries, and anything else of note. There follows the first- to fourth-place entries in that order, after which is listed a (usually) generous number of Honorable Mentions, and the week's report ends with a reminder of which contest results will appear the next week. On occasion, the Post website includes "overflow" Honorable Mentions absent from the print editions; this is typically limited to contest results in which each entry is necessarily lengthy (e.g., song parody lyrics) and the print column capable of running only a small number of entries.

== Winning isn't everything ==
Aside from the typical Winner, Runners-Up, and Honorable Mentions, there have been many other means to get one's name in print over the years. Ongoing methods include donating the weird prizes, suggesting the contest for the week, supplying a revised title for Honorable Mention entries for a given week's results, and writing the revised contest title that runs when the contest results are printed. There is an occasional "Anti-Invitational" entry printed (being an entry that is directly opposite what was asked for in the contest). Defunct past themes included writing the "Ear No One Reads", being "Uncle's Pick" (a reference to a humorless figure nominated to replace the Czar years ago), being the Rookie of the Week, and penning the Contest's short-lived "Dead Presidents" comic strip.

Individuals are often singled out for abuse by Czar or Empress. Verbal abuse is frequently heaped upon writers of remarkably obscene or distasteful entries, and individuals who whine about the judging (see Russell Beland) or overtly lobby for their own entries. The Empress is constantly on the look out for flagrant plagiarism (defined as "being in touch with one's inner Google"), the penalty for which is severe admonition and retribution.

== Prizes ==
Prizes have changed under the current administration, as tabulated below. In March 2012, a reusable grocery bag was introduced as a new runner-up prize; just weeks later, the Empress switched to a new first-place statue, the "Inkin' Memorial" (an Abraham Lincoln bobblehead) from the original "Inker" (a bookend of The Thinker with a paper bag over its head) after the bookends went out of manufacture. In 2017, a new trophy, the "Lose Cannon", replaced the "Inkin' Memorial", when it too became unavailable.

	Under the Czar (old)	Under the Empress (new)	Under the Empress (starting in April 2012)
Winner	A strange, weird thing that few people would want. Changes every week	A trophy known as the "Inker"	A trophy known as the "Inkin' Memorial". Replaced in 2017 by a new trophy known as the "Lose Cannon". This was replaced in December 2020 by the "Clowning Achievement", a clown head.
First Runner-Up	A Style Invitational Pen	A strange, weird thing that few people would want. Changes every week	A strange, weird thing that few people would want. Changes every week
Other Runners-Up	A Style Invitational Shirt	Choice of a Style Invitational Shirt or Coffee Mug	Choice of a Style Invitational Coffee Mug or Grocery Bag (T-shirts were phased out)
Honorable Mentions	A Style Invitational Bumper Sticker	A Style Invitational Refrigerator Magnet	A Style Invitational Refrigerator Magnet
First Time in Print	Standard prize (from those above)	A Fir Tree Air Freshener (FirStink)	A Fir Tree Air Freshener (FirStink)
