= The Washington Post Writers Group =

Press syndication service

- Company type: Syndication
- Industry: Media
- Founded: 1973; 52 years ago
- Headquarters: Washington, D. C., United States
- Area served: United States
- Services: opinion journalists, editorial cartoonists, comic strips, and columnists
- Owner: The Washington Post
- Parent: The Washington Post News Service & Syndicate
- Divisions: The Washington Post News Service with Bloomberg News
- Website: washingtonpost.com/syndication

The Washington Post Writers Group (WPWG), a division of The Washington Post News Service & Syndicate, is a press syndication service distributing opinion columnists, breaking news, podcasts and video journalism, lifestyle content, and graphics and data visualizations. The service is operated by The Washington Post.

== History ==
The Washington Post Writers Group formed in 1973.

In 2009, the Post dissolved its relationship with the Los Angeles Times (see the Los Angeles Times–Washington Post News Service) and joined with Bloomberg News to form The Washington Post News Service with Bloomberg News, which provided up to 150 national and international stories plus photos and graphics.

In 2013 the Writers Group was providing syndicated columns, editorial cartoons, features, and comic strips to newspapers, magazines, and other subscribers globally.

The Washington Post Writers Group wound down distributing editorial cartoons and comic strips starting in early 2022; announcing it would finish out any existing contracts. In response, a number of strips left for other syndicates. In addition, a group of the syndicate's editorial cartoonists — including Clay Bennett, Jack Ohman, and Pedro X. Molina — left for Nick Anderson's Counterpoint Media, which launched its own syndication service.

== Writers ==
Writers syndicated by the group include Eugene Robinson, Catherine Rampell, Fareed Zakaria, Kathleen Parker, E. J. Dionne, George Will, and Ruth Marcus. The late Charles Krauthammer was also a syndicate member.

== Comic strips ==
The syndicate began distributing comic strips in the early 1970s; its first notable strip was Berkeley Breathed's Bloom County. Long-running strips distributed by the service included Brian Crane's Pickles (1990–2022), Dave Blazek's Loose Parts (1991–2022), and Darrin Bell's strips Rudy Park (2001–2018) and Candorville (2003–2022).

=== Current comic strips ===
As of April 2023 the Washington Post was syndicating:

- Fort Knox by Paul Jon Boscacci (launched in 2009)
- Reply All and Reply All Lite by Donna A. Lewis (launched February 28, 2011)

=== Comic strips formerly distributed ===
- 12:01 by Thomas Boldt (May 1999–c. 1999)
- Barney & Clyde by Gene Weingarten, Dan Weingarten, and David Clark (2010–2023; moved to Counterpoint Media)
- Bloom County by Berkeley Breathed (1980–1989)
- Candorville by Darrin Bell (2003–2022; moved to King Features Syndicate)
- Home and Away by Steve Sicula (2003–2015)
- Little Dog Lost by Steve Boreman (March 26, 2007–July 24, 2016)
- Loose Parts by Dave Blazek (September 25, 2014–May 31, 2022; moved to Andrews McMeel Syndication) — originally acquired from Tribune Media Services (which had acquired it from the Los Angeles Times Syndicate)
- Middle Ages by Ron Jaudon (January 7, 1985–December 10, 1985)
- Mike du Jour by Mike Lester (2012–2022; moved to Andrews McMeel)
- Out of the Gene Pool / Single and Looking by Matt Janz (2001–2008)
- Outland by Berkeley Breathed (1989-1995)
- Opus by Berkeley Breathed (2003–2008)
- Pickles by Brian Crane (1990–2022; moved to Andrews McMeel)
- Red and Rover by Brian Basset (2000–2010; moved to Universal Uclick/Andrews McMeel, where it continues to the present)
- Rudy Park by Darrin Bell (c. 2011–2018; acquired from United Features Syndicate, where it launched in 2001)
- Safe Havens by Bill Holbrook (1988–1992; moved to King Features Syndicate, where it continues to the present)
- Stitches by Jeff Danziger (April 1997–c. 1998)
- Watch Your Head by Cory Thomas (2006–2014)

== See also ==
- Los Angeles Times-Washington Post News Service
