= Fort Knox (disambiguation) =

Fort Knox may refer to:

- Fort Knox United States Army post in Kentucky
- Fort Knox, Kentucky, census-designated place
- Fort Knox (Maine), historic fort in Maine, United States
- Fort Knox I, Fort Knox II, Northwest Territory forts from 1787 to 1813; see Forts of Vincennes, Indiana
- United States Bullion Depository located at Fort Knox
- Fort Knox (comic)
- Fort Knox Gold Mine, an open pit mine near Fairbanks, Alaska
- Fort Knox, the codename of a failed project at IBM to consolidate their midrange systems.
- "Fort Knox" (Sigrid song), 2025
- "Fort Knox" (Noel Gallagher's High Flying Birds song), 2017
