= Barreca =

Barreca is an Italian surname. Notable people with the surname include:

- Antonio Barreca (born 1995), Italian footballer
- Gina Barreca (born 1957), American academic and humorist
