= Rudy Park =

Comic strip by Theron Heir and Darrin Bell

- Author: Theron Heir (2001–2012); Darrin Bell (2012-present)
- Illustrator: Darrin Bell (2001–2018)
- Website: www.rudypark.com
- Current status/schedule: Running (sporadically)
- Launch date: September 3, 2001
- Syndicate(s): United Feature Syndicate (2001–c. 2011); The Washington Post Writers Group (c. 2011–2022); Counterpoint Media (September 1, 2022–present)
- Publisher: Andrews McMeel Publishing
- Genre(s): Humor, technology, politics

Rudy Park is a syndicated comic strip created by Theron Heir and Darrin Bell. It ran from 2001 to 2018, when it went on hiatus.

== Publication history ==
Rudy Park was created in 1997, with Heir and Bell self-syndicating it to San Jose Mercury News' former Sunday magazine, SV, and other high-tech magazines.

It was picked up for syndication by United Feature Syndicate in 2001. Around 2011 it switched syndicates to The Washington Post Writers Group (which also distributed Bell's other strip Candorville).

Theron Heir a.k.a. Matt Richtel, wrote the strip from 2001–2012, when he announced he was taking a year-long sabbatical to focus on other projects. Illustrator Bell at that point took over the writing duties. Although the intention was Heir would return to writing the strip after the one-year sabbatical, there is no indication he has done so and Bell has continued the writing and illustrating duties.

Rudy Park and Candorville exist in a shared universe. For a period in 2017, the strips were amalgamated while Bell was dealing with health and exhaustion issues. In June 2018, Bell temporarily ended Rudy Park, although characters from the strip continued to appear in Candorville. By the summer of 2018, Rudy Park was only appearing in a few dozen newspapers.

Although no longer appearing in print, Rudy Park continued to be syndicated by The Washington Post Writer's Group, possibly only to websites. In September 2022, the strip switched syndicates to Counterpoint Media.

== Story and characters ==
The syndicated strip started in early 2001, when its principal character was laid off from his job at a dot-com company but eventually found a new job as a barista in a coffee shop/internet cafe, the House of Java Cybercafe. Because of its early allusion to the dot-com bust, the strip occasionally takes on current events but in a more lightweight manner compared to Bell's other creation, Candorville.

The strip usually focuses on Rudy and his nemesis Sadie Cohen, a frequent customer and octogenarian who disdains Rudy's love for new technology. Other characters include: Armstrong Maynard, Rudy's cheapskate boss; Randy "The Rock" Taylor, a neurotic ex-athlete who frequently hangs out around the bar; and Rudy's Uncle Mort, an aging social liberal prone to protesting in the bar with his trusty bullhorn.

In January 2007, the strip's creators had Mort die of a heart attack, just weeks after his wedding to Mrs. Cohen. He died during a heated argument with Donald Rumsfeld, who had begun visiting the cafe after his ouster as Defense Secretary. For reasons yet to be revealed, Mort came back to life in February 2009.

== Collections ==
Two collections of the strip have been published: Rudy Park: The People Must Be Wired (2003), and Peace, Love, Lattes: A Rudy Park Collection (2004).

Rudy Park: The People Must Be Wired takes on the fast pace of the technology-driven world, our obsession with materialism, and the foibles of cultural and political icons. The story takes place at an Internet café, following the lives of a regular cast of characters, including Rudy, the café's manager, who believes in all things Internet, the healing powers of consumption, and the conviction that inner peace lies in having the latest technological gadget. Rudy must deal with his new station in life, his entrepreneurial boss, and an odd assortment of regular patrons, like Mrs. Cohen, an irascible octogenarian who challenges Rudy at every turn. The café is also a crossroads for contemporary issues and celebrity and political visitors, such as John Ashcroft, who monitors people from his home inside a pastry container at the cafe, and Senator Tom Daschle, who is afraid to draw too much attention to himself, lives under a table.
