= Out of the Gene Pool =

Former comic strip by Matt Janz

- Author(s): Matt Janz
- Current status/schedule: Concluded daily; reruns
- Launch date: December 31, 2001
- End date: June 22, 2008
- Alternate name(s): Single and Looking (2007–conclusion)
- Syndicate(s): The Washington Post Writers Group (reruns) GoComics (2016–present)

Out of the Gene Pool was an American syndicated comic strip by Matt Janz that appeared daily in newspapers from December 31, 2001, to June 22, 2008.

== Publication history ==
Out of the Gene Pool grew out of an earlier strip Janz had created called critters (spelled in all lowercase), where a bunch of odd-looking creatures overran a small town to the disgust of its residents. The Washington Post Writers Group, which syndicated Out of the Gene Pool, helped Janz develop the strip into what eventually became the final product.

For the final eleven months of its run, the strip was known as Single and Looking. As part of the change, Janz completely changed the focus of the strip in the hopes that this would get more newspapers to buy it. The move proved unsuccessful and Janz decided to bring his creation to its conclusion. In doing so, he said that while he enjoyed his time on the comics page he wanted to give his space in newspapers to comics with "actual growth potential".

== Characters and story ==
When Out of the Gene Pool debuted, the focus was originally around a man named Rufus, a rather large man with hair all over his body, and his family and life in a generic town called Middletown (the state where it was located never revealed). Rufus was married to a woman named Andy (short for Andrea) and had a son named Miller, who resembled his father.

Rufus and Andy were friends with a divorced African-American mother named Jackie Jerzy (who was the only character to have a known last name), who lived next door and had a son named Travis who was best friends with Miller and who tried to reunite his parents at all costs. Andy and Jackie worked together in an office building as well as holding jobs as seasonal cashiers at "Z-Mart", a local discount chain.

In 2004, Janz introduced a new character, Andy's brother Sam, who had moved to Middletown in search of a job. Rufus found him a job at the factory where he worked, but the company that owned the factory shut it down and left everyone out of work. Sam's roommate Zoogie, a small furry being of indeterminate species, moved with him to Middletown and tried to relive his college days, but was unable to.

Another main character was Madame Red, an older, cranky woman with a clown-like appearance and a hostile demeanor. She worked several part-time jobs in the town (including flipping burgers at a local chain and writing an advice column called "Dear Kitty" for the local paper) and was married to a man named Herbert, who was never seen and who she always seemed to yell at on a regular basis.

Other characters included Puff Maghee, the star of the local baseball team who took massive amounts of steroids; his girlfriend Bridgett, a spoiled-brat teen pop singing sensation that called Middletown home; Blizzy, a snowman Travis built that came to life every winter but melted every spring; and Alison McDermitt, Zoogie's folk singer ex-girlfriend who reappeared on several occasions, moving to Zimbabwe following her last appearance.

=== Change to Single and Looking ===
Janz made the aforementioned drastic change to his strip beginning with the July 30, 2007, strip. In addition to changing its name to Single and Looking, he streamlined the strip significantly and cut Rufus and his family out altogether, which Janz took hard as Rufus was one of his first creations dating back to his days drawing "critters". Sam and Jackie became the main characters of the strip, with Travis, Zoogie, and Madame Red playing supporting roles. Sam took Andy's place as Jackie's best friend and coworker, and more focus was placed on his love life. Jackie, meanwhile, had more emphasis placed on her struggle to find a new husband.

Although Janz's motives were to get more papers to buy his strip, it quickly became clear that the change wasn't going to bring him that and he eventually came to the decision to end the strip on his own. Janz sarcastically said, "Maybe it needed a talking cat," on the announcement of its demise. He also said that he was ending the strip to focus on other interests and said that while he enjoyed drawing the strip, he was also working a part-time job on top of that and decided to focus on one career.

=== Final story arc ===
The final storyline of the Out of the Gene Pool/Single and Looking strip began on June 15, 2008. Sam and Jackie were standing in line at the local burger joint discussing their tax stimulus refunds when suddenly a real estate agent walked in and started showing the space to Wally and Dilbert from Dilbert, saying that they needed to buy the space because of interest from Slylock Fox. Madame Red took the opportunity to call dibs on the fax machine.

The next day, Sam confessed to Jackie in the office that he had a feeling that something big and catastrophic was going to happen. On June 17 the real estate agent returned, showing the strip to Thel and Billy from The Family Circus and telling them that the panels offered them much more space than the current circle they reside in.

By the Wednesday strip of that week, Jackie had suggested to Sam that he go see "Madame Stella", a Middletown psychic, about his feelings about his own mortality.

The June 19th strip saw Jackie talking to Sam and criticizing him for his feelings, saying that there was no proof that they were going anywhere. They then were met by a pair of Zeeba Zeeba Eata member crocodiles from Pearls Before Swine, who had apparently bought the space and were set to move in. "Dis awkwurd momeent," said one of the crocodiles upon their discovery.

The final daily strip, which ran on June 21, saw Jackie finally tell Sam what she thought, saying that her life was too good right now and that she believed in a higher power and that he would tell her when it was time to go. She then was promptly "erased", bringing a statement from Madame Red: "Thou shalt not overstay your welcome in the comics."

=== Final strip ===
For the last (Sunday) strip, Janz drew one large panel to bring the entire series to a close. In said strip Rufus, Andy, and Miller returned for their first appearances since the strip changed its name to Single and Looking, and the characters acknowledged they were living in a comic strip. In the strip, Jackie remarked about the fact that the strip had no closure and they'd never know if she got remarried or not. Rufus (the only of the returning characters with a line) responded with "Now you know how we felt," referring to the demise of the original Out of the Gene Pool. Sam asked if there was a relative that could take over the strip. Travis remarked, "The economy must really be bad if comic characters are losing their jobs." The final line was uttered by Madame Red, who said, "We almost lasted as long as Peanuts...in dog years"; she was spotted with a suitcase and the fax machine she presumably called dibs on. Janz closed the strip by thanking his readers for their support.

== Reruns and collections ==
Immediately after the strip concluded, Andrews McMeel Universal began carrying reruns of Out of the Gene Pool on their website GoComics.com. The website started from the beginning and has continued to make reruns available as of December 2016.

Janz also compiled a "best of" collection of strips titled Big, Hairy Noses and other comical flaws: The First, Last, and Only Out Of The Gene Pool Collection. Released later in 2008, the book is only available at Lulu.com and is printed on demand.
