= Pickles (comic strip) =

American comic strip

- The main cast of Pickles
- Author: Brian Crane
- Website: Pickles Comic
- Current status/schedule: Running
- Launch date: April 2, 1990
- Syndicate(s): Andrews McMeel Syndication (July 1, 2022–present); The Washington Post Writers Group (Apr 1990–June 2022)
- Publisher: Baobab Press
- Genre: Humor

Pickles is a daily and Sunday comic strip by Brian Crane focusing on a retired couple in their seventies, Earl and Opal Pickles. Pickles has been published since April 2, 1990.

== Publication ==
As of 2016, Pickles was syndicated in close to 1,000 newspapers worldwide.

In 2022, Pickles moved syndicates from The Washington Post Writers Group (which had previously announced it was shutting down its comic strip business) to Andrews McMeel Syndication.

== Story and characters ==
Inspired by Crane's in-laws, the strip describes their efforts to enjoy retirement, which instead proves quite imperfect for both. Earl Pickles, a retired philosophy professor, is bald and has a bushy white mustache; he also wears glasses and suspenders. He is described as "a couch potato, curmudgeon and all-around geezer-in-residence." Opal Pickles also wears glasses and is often seen wearing purple polka-dotted dresses and white sneakers. She is "a devoted wife, mother, grandmother, Red Hat Lady and cat servant." When sitting, she is usually seen with her pet cat, Muffin, in her lap (on some occasions, Muffin tends to lie on Earl's lap to his disdain). Both characters were drawn with their eye pupils visible through their glasses during the strip's early years, but their glasses were later whitened so that they are opaque to readers.

The cast includes their dog, Roscoe; their cat, Muffin; their 6-year-old grandson, Nelson Wolfe; Nelson's mother and stepfather — their daughter, Sylvia, and her husband, Dan, a wildlife photographer; Clyde, Earl's friend; and Pearl, Opal's sister, who dated Earl many years ago. Opal's friend Emily also occasionally appears. Roscoe and Muffin are depicted with thought balloons (like Snoopy or Garfield) to express their personal views whenever they observe the daily routines of their humans or other incidents.

In the foreword to the first of Crane's Pickles books, Charles Schulz, creator of the Peanuts comic, stated, "I think it would be very comforting to have Earl and Opal for neighbors."

== Awards and honors ==
- In 2001, Pickles was named best newspaper comic strip of the year by the National Cartoonists Society.
- In 2013, Brian Crane shared the Reuben Award with Rick Kirkman.

== Bibliography ==
The strips have been collected in book form in:

- Pickles (1998)
- Pickles, Too: The Older I Get, The Better I Was (1999)
- Still Pickled After All These Years (2002)
- Let's Get Pickled! (2006)
- How Come I Always Get Blamed for the Things I Do? (2010)
- Oh Sure! Blame it on the Dog! (2013)

A 25th anniversary retrospective, 25 Years of Pickles, was released by Baobab Press in 2015.
