= Eric Shansby =

American cartoonist

- Born: 1985 (age 40–41)
- Education: Yale University
- Occupations: editorial cartoonist, illustrator
- Known for: "Below the Beltway"
- Awards: Scholastic Press Association's 2002 Gold Circle Awards; The Freedom Forum's Free Spirit Scholarship; Maryland Scholastic Press and Quill & Scroll Society/National Newspaper Association's editorial cartoon awards
- Website: www.ericshansby.com

Eric Shansby (born 1985) commonly known as Shansby, is an American cartoonist and children's book illustrator. His cartoons appear in American news outlets, most prominently in The Washington Post alongside columns by humorist Gene Weingarten.

== Early life and education ==
Shansby grew up in Silver Spring, Maryland. His mother was a librarian. He was interested in art from a young age and would trace the images in the library books his mother brought home to him. He drew caricatures of his classmates and teachers in elementary school.

Shansby published his first comic strip in his sophomore year of Montgomery Blair High School, where he was the art editor and a cartoonist for his high school newspaper. He created both editorial cartoons and a strip OxyMoron. There, he met Washington Post writer Gene Weingarten when Weingarten gave a guest lecture in Shansby's journalism class. When Weingarten first saw Shansby's work, he noted it was "breathtaking stuff."

For his work in high school, Shansby won The Freedom Forum's Free Spirit Scholarship and the Maryland Scholastic Press and Quill & Scroll Society/National Newspaper Association's editorial cartoon awards. At the 2002 Columbia Scholastic Press Association's Gold Circle Awards, he placed first in art/illustration portfolio, comic cartoons, editorial cartoons, and sports cartoons. In addition, he came in second place for his cartoon portfolio and third place for editorial cartoons. He graduated from high school in 2003.

Shansby studied philosophy at Yale University, graduating in 2007. At Yale, he was a member of St. Anthony Hall and was also a political cartoonist for the Yale Daily News.

== Career ==
While in high school, Shansby drew editorial cartoons for the weekly Montgomery County Sentinel. His political cartoons covered AIDS, environmental issues, gay marriage, human cloning, public education, and the Iraq War. Once in college, he continued submitting to the Sentinel. His work was also published in Young D.C. and The Report Press Law Magazine.

In 2004, Gene Weingarten asked him to illustrate Below the Beltway, his weekly humor column in The Washington Post Magazine. Shansby began contributing to Below the Beltway while he was a freshman in college. He also had a regular feature on the KidsPost website.

Shansby illustrated the 2014 children's book Me & Dog, a parable on atheism written by Weingarten.

In September 2018, Shansby left Below the Beltway as part of the redesign of The Washington Post Magazine. Wiengarten stopped writing the column in 2021.

== Personal life ==
On the Kojo Nnamdi Show, Shansby identified himself as a “culturally Jewish, American atheist.”

== Publications ==
=== Books ===
- Me & Dog. Simon & Schuster, Simon & Schuster, 2014. Written by Gene Weingarten and illustrated by Eric Shansby. ISBN 9781442494138

=== As Contributing Artist ===
- Compleating Cul de Sac. Thompson, Richard, et al. Team Cul de Sac and ComicsDC, 2015.
- Failure by Design: The Story Behind America’s Broken Economy. Bivens, Josh. Cornell University Press, 2011. ISBN 9780801461132
- World Politics in a New Era, 4th Edition. Spiegel, Steven L., et al. Oxford University Press, 2008. ISBN 0495007595
- Best Editorial Cartoons of the Year 2007. Brooks, Charles (Ed.). Pelican Publishing, 2007. ISBN 9781589804593
- Best Editorial Cartoons of the Year 2006. Brooks, Charles (Ed.). Pelican Publishing, 2006. ISBN 9781589803978
- Best Editorial Cartoons of the Year 2005. Brooks, Charles (Ed.). Pelican Publishing, 2005. ISBN 9781589802841
- Best Editorial Cartoons of the Year 2004. Brooks, Charles (Ed.). Pelican Publishing, 2004. ISBN 9781589802001
