= Barney & Clyde =

Daily newspaper comic strip

- Authors: Gene Weingarten; Dan Weingarten
- Illustrator: David Clark
- Website: www.gocomics.com/barneyandclyde
- Current status/schedule: Ongoing daily
- Launch date: June 7, 2010
- Syndicate(s): Counterpoint Media (2023–present); The Washington Post Writers Group (2010–2023)
- Genres: Humor; friendship; family

Barney & Clyde is a daily newspaper comic strip created by Washington Post columnist Gene Weingarten, his son Dan Weingarten, and cartoonist David Clark. Originally syndicated by The Washington Post Writers Group, it debuted on June 7, 2010. Barney & Clyde appears in The Washington Post, The Miami Herald, The Detroit Free Press and many other newspapers.

== History ==
On Father's Day 2010, Gene Weingarten wrote about how their collaboration began.

In 2011, Florida resident Horace LaBadie began suggesting scripts to the creators. In time, he became a frequent contributor to the strip.

In 2022, The Washington Post Writers Group announced it was winding down its comic strip business; Barney & Clyde eventually was picked up for syndication by Counterpoint Media.

== Characters ==
Barney & Clyde is about the friendship between a billionaire and a homeless man.

Title characters:

- J. Barnard (Barney) Pillsbury -- owner and CEO of multinational drug company Pillsbury Pharmaceuticals.
- Clyde Finster -- a homeless man. Clyde cares for a rabbit named Adolf (in honor of Adolf of Osnabrück, the patron saint of alms and charity for the poor). When panhandling, Clyde refers to Adolf by his stage name, Fluffykins McNeedsahug. On April 21, 2025, Clyde announced that Adolf had died. On August 22, 2025, Clyde has a new rabbit, Baroness Helga von Schicklgruber, aka Crinklenose O'Sparklepants.

Barney's family:

- Lucretia Pillsbury -- Barney's second (and current) wife.
- Cynthia Pillsbury -- Barney's 11-year-old daughter from his first marriage.
- Eb Pillsbury -- Barney's father, who has memory issues. He has a robotic dog, Webster.

Additional characters (alphabetical):

- Charles -- Barney and Lucretia's chauffeur.
- Consuela -- Barney and Lucretia's housekeeper.
- Dabney Mountbatten IV -- Clyde's homeless friend.
- Duane Butkis -- an assistant to Barney at his pharmaceutical company.
- Horace -- a street denizen who tells arcane jokes other characters do not understand.
- Ms. Foxx -- an assistant to Barney at his pharmaceutical company.
- Ms. Lanham -- Cynthia's teacher.
- Rachel Jones -- principal at Cynthia's school.
