= A Deadly Wandering =

2014 book by Matt Richtel

A Deadly Wandering: A Mystery, a Landmark Investigation, and the Astonishing Science of Attention in the Digital Age
- Author: Matt Richtel
- Subject: Psychology
- Genre: Non-fiction
- Publisher: HarperCollins
- Publication date: 2014
- Media type: Print (hardback & paperback)
- Pages: 416
- ISBN: 978-0062284075

A Deadly Wandering: A Mystery, a Landmark Investigation, and the Astonishing Science of Attention in the Digital Age is a 2014 book by Matt Richtel. It details the story of Reggie Shaw, a Mormon teenager who killed two scientists in Utah in 2006 while he was texting and driving. Richtel also reports scientific studies on human attention interspersed with the narrative.

== Background ==
A Deadly Wandering is based on a series of articles in The New York Times that Richtel wrote in 2010, garnering him a Pulitzer Prize. His 2011 novel Devil's Plaything dealt with themes of personal technology and its sometimes harmful impact on society.

== Synopsis ==
On September 22, 2006, nineteen-year-old Utah college student Reggie Shaw is texting and driving with his girlfriend when he crosses the yellow lines on the highway west of Logan, Utah. He causes a chain-reaction accident that kills James Furfaro and Keith O’Dell, two rocket scientists headed to work. Unharmed, Shaw attempts to call 911 but the call didn't go through. A state trooper that comes to the scene said he witnessed “a collision so violent it popped out the passengers’ eyeballs.” Despite initially denying he was texting and driving, and his parents vehemently standing behind him, Shaw eventually admits to it when faced with damning evidence. Richtel examines the police investigation and Shaw's prosecution, which was a test case in terms of accident litigation. Shaw ended up serving several weeks in prison for negligent homicide.

Richtel intersperses this narrative with scientific studies of attention and the human mind. He details the history of cognitive neuroscience, from its beginnings in World War II in assisting pilots to not become overwhelmed by technology, to its current applications with MRI studies. Richtel cites a study that claims motorists are impaired for 15 seconds after they text. He explains how cell phone companies initially denied texting and driving was a dangerous activity. Indeed, Richtel notes, not a single state banned the practice when the accident occurred. Eventually, Reggie Shaw becomes a prominent advocate against distracted driving. He is forgiven by the families of the scientists he killed.

== Reception ==
Robert Kolker of The New York Times gave the book a positive review. He wrote, "As an instructive social parable, Richtel’s densely reported, at times forced yet compassionate and persuasive book deserves a spot next to “Fast Food Nation” and “To Kill a Mockingbird” in America’s high school curriculums. To say it may save lives is self-evident." Kolker notes that, "The most powerful question raised by “A Deadly Wandering” is a simple one: If we know texting and driving is so bad for us, why do we still do it?" The Christian Science Monitor said that the book is a "keen and elegantly raw – like a tooth-crackingly crisp photograph that bleeds at the edges – story surrounding this disaster is not just a morality tale about texting and driving, but also a probe sent into the world of technology, examining the way it is outstripping our capability to keep up with it, and how we as a culture are feeding bullets into the techno-gun and playing with it." Daniel Dyer of The Plain Dealer liked how Richtel changed narrative focus "to keep us continually apprised of the actions of his various principals and supporting players."
