= Candorville =

Comic strip by Darrin Bell

- Author(s): Darrin Bell
- Current status/schedule: Cancelled
- Launch date: October 19, 2003
- End date: February 9, 2025
- Syndicate(s): The Washington Post Writers Group (2003-2022); King Features Syndicate (2022-2025)
- Publisher(s): Andrews McMeel Publishing
- Genre(s): Satire, Politics

Candorville is a syndicated newspaper comic strip written and illustrated by Darrin Bell. Launched in September 2003 by The Washington Post Writers Group, Candorville features young black and Latino characters living in the inner city. Using the vehicle of humor, Candorville presents social and political commentary as well as the stories of its protagonists. Candorville was suspended in 2025 due to Bell's arrest on child pornography charges.

== Publication history ==
Candorville grew out of a comic strip called Lemont Brown, which appeared in the student newspaper of UC Berkeley, The Daily Californian, from 1993 to 2003. It still appears in the Daily Californian under its new title, and it is that newspaper's longest-running comic strip. Candorville appears in most of America's largest newspapers. It also runs in Spanish-language newspapers where it is translated by the author's wife, Laura Bustamante.

Candorville and Bell's other strip, Rudy Park, exist in a shared universe. For a period in 2017, the strips were amalgamated while Bell was dealing with health and exhaustion issues. In June 2018, Bell ended Rudy Park, although characters from that strip will continue to appear in Candorville. (Candorville is syndicated in many more newspapers than was Rudy Park.)

Because of its political content, Candorville, like Doonesbury, sometimes appears on a newspaper's editorial page rather than its comics page; like G.B. Trudeau's strip, Candorville has been described as having a liberal slant, which has prevented the strip from being syndicated to some right-leaning newspapers. This is despite the fact that Candorville has lampooned liberal organizations like PETA, and liberal politicians like Hillary Clinton, Howard Dean, John Edwards, and Barack Obama.

In late 2022 syndication of Candorville moved to King Features Syndicate as the Washington Post Writers Group wound down its comics line.

In January 2025, Candorville was suspended following Bell's arrest on child pornography charges.

== Characters and story ==
=== Main characters ===
- Lemont Brown is the strip's main character. A talented young black writer, Lemont began regularly submitting articles to The New Yorker, and was regularly rejected in humiliating fashion. During this period Lemont worked for minimum wage at Pigville Pork Burgers. Constant prodding from his best friend Susan led him to create his own blog, which eventually led to his employment by a newspaper. Lemont is thoughtful, responsible, and clever, and he cares about both the world and his small circle of friends, whom he has known all his life. He is the consummate nerd, cannot dance, and is obsessed with science fiction. He is often seen self-referentially reading the book Thank God for Culture Clash, which is a collection of Candorville cartoons. He got engaged to Roxanne, an ignorant and deranged woman who had his love child. Based on actions in the strip, he did not appear to love this woman, but proposed to her anyway, apparently to stay close to his child. Eventually they broke up, with Lemont gaining custody of his son. This is a conflict with his (slowly and subconsciously) developing romantic feelings for and relationship with Susan Garcia.
- Susan Garcia is Lemont's best friend. An upwardly-mobile Latina who works as a top executive at an advertising agency, Susan is ambitious, straightforward, and self-centered. She is constantly frustrated that Lemont does not seem to know how to make his dream a reality, as she did. She has a sister who changed her name from Esperanza to Hope in order to appear to be Anglo instead of Mexican. Susan has known Lemont all her life and they have been platonic friends, but they seem to have deeper romantic feelings for one another that neither one will acknowledge. When Lemont frustrates her, she occasionally lapses into Spanish, like Ricky Ricardo. Susan's nemesis is her assistant at work, Dick Fink, who seems to sabotage her and obviously wants her job. Her clueless and ethically challenged boss is Mr. Fitzhugh. Mr. Fitzhugh often makes small changes to Susan's advertising campaigns to make them more dishonest. He once wore a T-shirt to work that said: "We invaded Iraq and all I got was this lousy $25 million contract."
- Clyde Dogg (also known as C-Dog) is Lemont's foil. Like Lemont, Clyde grew up in a broken home. Unlike Lemont, Clyde is irresponsible and lazy, and he blames everyone else for his own shortcomings. He seems to purposely validate every stereotype about black men, for which Lemont regularly scolds him. He seems stupid at times, but other times it seems as though his "stupidity" is an act he puts on just to thumb his nose to the world. Clyde dresses and acts like a thug, and very well might be one. But the only time he has been seen stealing so far, it has been from Lemont. He gets caught, but perhaps it's because he wants to get caught. He often calls Lemont "Big L", probably a reference to the rapper of the same name since Big L's first name was also Lamont. He castigates Lemont for "acting white" whenever Lemont reads a book or crosses the street at a crosswalk, and he jealously guards his thuggish street reputation. He once crossed the street at a crosswalk, for which his other friends called him a sellout. To get back in their good graces, C-Dog put a recliner in the middle of a busy street and went to sleep on it during rush hour, for which he was sent to jail. C-Dog is an aspiring rapper, and is unemployed. He has an illegitimate business selling fake Botox injections out of his trench coat in a dark alley. Curiously, months after C-Dog began that business, several real-life incidents occurred where women died after receiving fake Botox injections. Clyde has also periodically showed moments of surprising political insight, such as when he talked about how Mr Church embodied the "Magical Negro" stereotype, and when he commented about racist policing.

=== Supporting characters ===
- Reverend Wilfred is a formerly liberal Democratic reverend in the mold of Al Sharpton, but after receiving almost $1 million from the White House Office of Faith-Based and Community Initiatives, the Reverend became an ultra-conservative Bush supporter who uses his pulpit to preach against the evils of liberalism. He may be somewhat based on Jesse Lee Peterson.
- Dick Fink is Susan's backstabbing assistant who is out to undermine her.
- Roxanne is Lemont's white fiancée. A vegan, Lemont brought her to a steak restaurant for their first date, and eventually, Roxanne ended up pregnant with Lemont's child. Lemont, whose father walked out on his mother when he was a child, is desperate to make sure his child avoids his fate, and agrees to marry her. While Lemont is easy-going and free-thinking, Roxanne is belligerent and bitter. She is insanely jealous of Susan and Lemont's friendship, and has attempted to break up the friendship between the two, but without success. Their child has been born and first appeared in a comic in October 2007.
- Saxon Kenchu is a childhood friend of Roxanne's who claims that she's actually a vampire.
- Bus Stop Guy is a neocon who goes through great logical contortions to rationalize current events, such as the push against stem-cell research, the Iraq War, driving an SUV, the campaign against gay marriage, and many other issues.
- Homeless Dudes Tyrone and Rosencrantz often appear living in alleys, cardboard boxes and on the sidewalks. They engage in absurdist dialogue and commentary. The two homeless characters may be an homage to the titular characters of the play Rosencrantz and Guildenstern Are Dead.
- Past and Future Lemont occasionally visits the present Lemont in his dreams. One version, who visits him from the past, is six or seven years old. The other version is 70–80 years old and speaks very cryptically.
- Mainstream Media Guy (also known as MSM guy) is a big, grinning, football jersey-wearing embodiment of the oblivious mainstream mass media. He first appeared in August 2006. Lemont runs into the MSM guy at the bus stop every once in a while, and the MSM guy shouts trivial news items to him, while ignoring or downplaying important events.
- Al Qaeda's #2 Man is a walking, dismembered corpse who keeps getting blown up, coincidentally every time President Bush or the GOP are scoring badly in opinion polls.

== Collections ==
Eight collections of Candorville have been published in book form:

1. Candorville: Thank God for Culture Clash (2005) — fearlessly covers bigotry, poverty, homelessness, biracialism, personal responsibility, and more while never losing sight of the humor behind these weighty issues. The strip targets the socially conscious by tackling tough issues with irony, satire, and humor.
2. Another Stereotype Bites the Dust: a Candorville Collection (2006)
3. Katrina's Ghost: The Third Candorville Collection (2009)
4. The Starbucks at the End of the World: The 4th Candorville Collection (2011)
5. Run! Vampires, Werewolves, the One That Got Away, and Other Demons: The 5th Candorville Collection (2011) — the story looks on the main character, Lemont, whose new success as The Chronicle's senior White House correspondent may be short-lived; as a startling revelation about his evil fiancée motivates him and Dr. Noodle to travel on a journey to Mexico, where they face bloodthirsty demons, vampires, werewolves, and drug cartels. At home, in honor of the first black President, Lemont's friend C-Dog summons the ghost of Richard Pryor for advice on how to stop saying the N-word. He finds himself on the run, impersonating Lemont on his book tour to hide from the insanely huge brother of a girl he's wronged. And as Susan makes a life-altering pact with her backstabbing assistant, Lemont travels back in time to the Nineties to help his younger self seduce her ex-lover.
6. Does the Afterlife Have Skittles?: The 6th Candorville Collection (2013)
7. Goodnight Grandpa (2015) — Bell's popular character, Lemont, has written a memoir, but when Lemont's friend, Susan, gets to the part where Lemont explains how he and a demon, La Llorona, accidentally caused the end of the world, Susan questions his sanity and debates on saving their relationship. While Lemont's political blog explodes, he faces his challenges at home. Lemont accompanies a 94-year-old World War II veteran on his final journey in the story.
8. Color-Blinded (2016) — Lemont is a single dad raising a mysteriously smart two-year-old. He's also a journalist single-handedly running one of the top news sites in the country. The comic is based around Lemont trying to figure out how to cover the breaking news in Uganda and Russia, and interview every candidate in the 2016 presidential race. Lamont has to face the process of explaining to his son why he's supposed to respect the police, when the police don't seem to face any repercussions for killing so many unarmed people who look just like his dad. Despite his best efforts, people start to wonder if C-Dog is secretly the smartest, most morally upstanding man in the neighborhood. At the ad agency, Susan discovers why her boss won't ever let her fire her evil, conniving assistant. And Lemont accompanies the recently departed comedian Robin Williams on his final journey.
