= Mike Lester =

American cartoonist

- Born: March 3, 1955 (age 71) Atlanta, Georgia, U.S.
- Areas: Editorial cartoonist Comic strip cartoonist
- Notable works: Mike du Jour; Buzz the Yellow Jacket; Rags the Tiger
- Awards: Reuben Award (2009); National Cartoonists Society

Michael Eugene Lester (born March 3, 1955) is an American conservative editorial cartoonist and artist who has worked as a children's book illustrator. He is also the creator of the syndicated comic strip Mike du Jour.

He was born in Atlanta, Georgia.

Mike du Jour launched in 1995, running in The Wall Street Journal until 1998. It began being syndicated in 2012, by The Washington Post Writers Group; in 2022 the strip moved to Andrews McMeel Syndication. Lester had previously moved his editorial cartooning work to Andrews McMeel in 2021.

Lester was arrested and jailed on August 20, 2009 for misdemeanor charges of battery and interfering with a 911 call originating from a domestic dispute with his wife, Regan Lester.

== Awards ==
Lester has received National Cartoonists Society awards multiple times.

In May 2009, Lester received the Reuben Award from the National Cartoonists Society for his work on the children's book Cool Daddy Rat.
