= Matt Richtel =

American writer and journalist

- Born: October 2, 1966 (age 59)
- Education: University of California at Berkeley, BA; Columbia School of Journalism, MS
- Occupations: author, journalist, comic strip writer
- Writing career
- Pen name: Theron Heir
- Notable works: A Deadly Wandering; Rudy Park

Matt Richtel (born October 2, 1966 in Los Angeles) is an American writer and journalist for The New York Times. He was awarded the 2010 Pulitzer Prize for National Reporting for a series on distracted driving.

== Education ==
Richtel obtained a bachelor's degree from the University of California at Berkeley and an MS from the Columbia School of Journalism.

== Career ==
He is the author of A Deadly Wandering, a New York Times-bestselling nonfiction narrative that intertwines the story of a car crash caused by a texting driver with a study of the science of attention. It was named one of the best books of 2014 by The Christian Science Monitor, San Francisco Chronicle, and Amazon, among others.

Richtel also writes fiction and has authored several mystery/thrillers, including Dead on Arrival (William Morrow, 2017), called by the New York Times Book Review "An intellectual thrill ride that tucks searing social critique into the Trojan horse of a save-the-world page-turner." He also wrote Doomsday Equation (2015), The Cloud, and Devil's Plaything. His first book, called Hooked, is about a reporter whose life is turned upside down when he escapes a cafe explosion after a stranger hands him a note in his dead fiancée's handwriting warning him to leave.

He co-created and formerly wrote the syndicated comic Rudy Park under the pen name Theron Heir. Since 2012, the strip is now written by its longtime illustrator Darrin Bell.

In 2010, Richtel wrote, and was interviewed, about the impact on the human brain of living with "a deluge of data" from digital devices. In the interview, he previewed his current investigation into the idea that "[t]here is some thought that the way kids' brains ... and frontal lobes ... are developing" differently from those of their parents and others of older generations. He said he expected to publish his work on this subject in early December.

His 2019 book, An Elegant Defense, follows the story of four individuals in a complex narrative that demonstrates the function of the immune system. His most recent book, How We Grow Up, released in 2025, and examines the history, function, biology, and changing nature of adolescence.

== Personal life ==
Richtel lives in Boulder, Colorado with his wife, son and daughter.
