= Home and Away (comic strip) =

American comic strip by Steve Sicula

- The Szwyks from Home and Away.
- Author(s): Steve Sicula
- Current status/schedule: concluded, daily
- Launch date: 2003; 22 years ago
- End date: August 2015; 9 years ago
- Syndicate(s): The Washington Post Writers Group
- Genre(s): Humor; Family

Home and Away was a comic strip written and drawn by Steve Sicula. It was syndicated nationally by the Washington Post Writers Group from 2003 to 2015.

== History ==
Sicula created Home and Away around age 40, after four or five of his other comic strips were rejected by publishers. The comic strip began in 2003 and ceased publication in August 2015.

== Characters and story ==
The strip is about the Szwyk family. Sam, the father, is a remote worker who is also in charge of homemaking, which he does with varying degrees of success. Sandy, the mother, is a successful saleswoman who is always on the go and trying to balance her personal and professional lives. Their two children, Karen and Timmy, are just as busy as their parents and, for better or worse, have picked up their parents' habits.
