= Bob Staake =

American cartoonist

- Born: September 26, 1957 (age 68); Los Angeles, California, U.S.
- Known for: Author–Illustrator
- Notable work: Look! A Book! (2010); The Donut Chef (2008); The Red Lemon (2006); The Orb of Chatham (2005); Hello, Robots! (2004)

Bob Staake /ˈstæk/ STAK (born September 26, 1957 in Los Angeles) is an American illustrator, cartoonist, children's book author and designer. He lives and works in Chatham, Massachusetts on the elbow of Cape Cod.

After drawing editorial cartoons while at West High School in Torrance, California, Staake attended the University of Southern California (1977) on a journalism/international relations scholarship. He interned at the Robert F. Kennedy Memorial's Students Press Law Center.

== Cartoons and illustration ==
Artwork by Staake has been published in the Chicago Tribune, Easy Reader, the Los Angeles Times, the Miami Herald, The New York Times, Sports Illustrated Kids, Time, USA Today, The Washington Post and The Wall Street Journal. His illustrations have appeared in advertising for numerous companies, including American Express, the Cartoon Network, Dr Pepper, Hallmark Cards, Kenner Toys, McDonald's, Nickelodeon, Ralston Purina, Sony and United Airlines.

Starting in 1993, Staake contributed concepts and cartoons to "The Style Invitational", a humor competition at The Washington Post. In 1995, he became a regular contributor to Mad. He created many covers for The New Yorker, beginning with the September 4, 2006 issue.

Staake is noted for using vintage software to create his illustrations. He currently uses Adobe Photoshop 3.0 on Classic in Mac OS X.

== Books ==
Staake began as a book illustrator in 1992 when he contributed to Jay Leno's Headlines (Warner Books). In 1998, he wrote and illustrated his first book for children, My Little 1 2 3 Book (Little Simon), a 26-page board book. He followed with numerous books for children, including The Red Lemon, named by The New York Times as one of the ten best illustrated children's books of 2006.

In The Complete Book of Caricature (North Light Books, 1991). Staake explained how a subject's personality is incorporated into a drawing and provided reference materials, along with samples of caricaturists, including David Levine, Mort Drucker and Ralph Steadman. In 1990, 1991 and 1993, Staake wrote and co-edited the Humor and Cartoon Markets series of resource books listing magazines, newsletters, greeting card companies and other publishers who purchase humorous illustrations. In 1996, for The Complete Book of Humorous Art (North Light), he interviewed 20 illustrators, including Gary Baseman, Lou Brooks and Elwood Smith.

In September 2016 Bob Staake released under the pseudonym Arthur Gackley a book of children's book covers for adults entitled Bad Little Children's Books. Three months after release blogger Kelly Jensen at Book Riot critiqued the humor book for propagating racist stereotypes. The subsequent online outcry led Staake to request that his publisher, Abrams Books, cease printing the book. The National Coalition Against Censorship, whose Board of Directors currently includes Abrams president and CEO Michael Jacobs, issued a statement in support of the book: “We support Abrams’ decision to publish this, or any other book, even if it offends some readers. We urge the company not to accede to pressure to withdraw the book, but to stand for the proposition that it is the right of authors to write as they choose and of individuals to decide for themselves what to read.” Abrams clarified in a statement that they were only ceasing future printings of the book in order to honor the author's request and would not otherwise have intervened.

== Influences ==
Diane Arbus, Aurelius Battaglia, Mary Blair, Jean Carlu, A. M. Cassandre, Paul Colin, Dr. Seuss, Charles and Ray Eames, Walker Evans, Tibor Gergely, Edward Gorey, Paul Klee, Alvin Lustig, John Parr Miller, Paul Rand, Richard Scarry, Raymond Scott, Ettore Sottsass, Philippe Starck and Grant Wood.

== Awards ==
- New York Times Best Illustrated Children's Books Award (2006)
- National Cartoonists Society, Reuben Award, Best Cartoonist in the Division of Newspaper Illustration (1997)

== Bibliography ==
Authored and illustrated by

- Bad Little Children's Books (2016) (ISBN 1-419-72226-3)
- Trucks Go Pop! (2008) (ISBN 0-316-00510-X)
- The Donut Chef (2008) (ISBN 0-375-84403-1)
- This Is Not a Pumpkin (2007) (ISBN 1-416-93353-0)
- The Red Lemon (2006) ISBN 0-375-83593-8 (2007)
- Struwwelpeter and Other Disturbing Tales for Human Beings (2006) (ISBN 1-560-97702-7)
- The Orb of Chatham (2005) (ISBN 1-933-21214-4)
- Hello, Robots (2004) (ISBN 0-670-05905-6)
- Little Golden Picture Dictionary (2002) (ISBN 0-307-96035-8)
- My Little Opposites Book (2001) (ISBN 0-689-83487-X)
- My Little Color Book (2001) (ISBN 0-689-83486-1)
- My Little 123 Book (1998) (ISBN 0-689-81660-X)

Authored by

- The Complete Book of Humorous Art (1996) (ISBN 0-891-34623-6)
- 1993 Humor and Cartoon Markets (1992) (ISBN 0-898-79559-1)
- 1991 Humor and Cartoon Markets (1991) (ISBN 0-898-79428-5)
- The Complete Book of Caricature (1991) (ISBN 0-891-34367-9)

Illustrated by

- A Fire Truck Named Red (2015) (ISBN 9780374300739)
- Sputter Sputter Sput (2008) (ISBN 0-060-56222-6)
- Mary Had a Little Lamp (2008) (ISBN 1-599-90169-2)
- I'm a Truck (2006) (ISBN 0-375-83263-7)
- One Hundred Shoes (2002) (ISBN 0-375-92178-8)
- What Am I? # (2007) (ASIN: B0014DBVA0)
- Pigs Rock! (2003) (ISBN 0-670-03581-5)
- Hairy Science (2000) (ISBN 0-448-44095-4)
- Thumbs up science (2000) (ISBN 0-448-44094-6)
- Bouncing science (2000) ( ISBN 0-448-44088-1)
- Shadowy science (2000) (ISBN 0-448-44089-X)
- Thumbs up science (2000) (ISBN 0-448-44094-6)
- June's Tune (2000) (ISBN 1-891-32726-7)
- The Mighty Little Lion Hunter (2000) (ISBN 1-891-32722-4)
- A Boy's guide to life (1998) (ISBN 0-201-15168-5)
- A Girl's guide to life (1997) (ISBN 0-201-15167-7)
- Splish!: A Hands-Free Guide to the Sea Monkeys' Greatest Show (1996) (ISBN 0-689-80815-1)
- Boing!: A Hands-Free Guide to Tricks, Gizmos & Natural Blunders (1996) (ISBN 0-689-80814-3)
- True and Tacky II: More Weird Stories from the World's Newswires (1992) (ISBN 0-886-87651-6)
- Headlines (1992) (ISBN 0-517-08238-1)
