= Brian Crane =

American cartoonist

- Born: Brian Crane Twin Falls, Idaho, U.S.
- Areas: Cartoonist, Writer
- Awards: Inkpot Award (2014)

Brian Crane is an American cartoonist who created Pickles, a comic strip featuring a retired couple, Earl and Opal Pickles, their family, and their family pets, Muffin (cat) and Roscoe (dog).

Crane was born in Twin Falls, Idaho, but was raised in the San Francisco Bay Area. According to his mother, Crane began drawing at an young age and had hopes to become a comic strip artist when he was older. As a young man, Crane served as a missionary of the Church of Jesus Christ of Latter-day Saints (LDS Church) in Uruguay and in 1973 he graduated with a bachelor of arts degree from Brigham Young University, with an emphasis on design and illustration.

As Crane got older, he felt that he lacked the talent and sense of humor needed to write material for a successful daily comic strip, so he pursued a career in graphic design and art direction and for a time was employed with art studios, publishing companies, and advertising agencies. As Crane neared the age of forty, he became disillusioned and grew tired of creating ads for products that he didn't believe in. Reminiscing about his childhood dream of being a comic strip artist, Crane decided to look into the syndication process by reading Mort Walker's autobiography. "I figured it was a better midlife option than buying a red Ferrari," Crane said. Crane eventually created Pickles, which has seen success since its creation in 1990.

== Career ==
Pickles was syndicated by The Washington Post Writers Group in 1990 and today appears in nearly 1,000 newspapers around the world. In 2001, it was awarded the prize for Best Comic Strip by the National Cartoonist Society. In 2005 and 2011, he was a nominee for Cartoonist of the Year by the same group. In 2013, he won the Reuben award for cartoonist of the year from the National Cartoonists Society (NCS). Crane creates Pickles by hand from a studio in his home in Sparks, Nevada. His daughter Emily colors the daily and Sunday strips for him.

== Bibliography ==
- Pickles (Taylor Trade Publishing, October 25, 1999, ISBN 978-1563525100)
- Pickles, Too: The Older I Get, the Better I Was (Taylor Trade Publishing, 1999)
- Still Pickled After All These Years (Andrews McMeel Publishing, April 2004, ISBN 978-0740743405)
- Let’s Get Pickled (Andrews McMeel Publishing, October 1, 2006, ISBN 978-0740761928)
- How Come I Always Get Blamed for the Things I Do? (Baobab Press, 2010, ISBN 978-1936097012)
- Oh, Sure! Blame It on the Dog! (Baobab Press, October 8, 2013, ISBN 978-1936097043)
- 25 Years of Pickles (Baobab Press, 2015, ISBN 978-1936097104)
- Grampa, Will You Tell Me a Story? (Baobab Press, 2018)
- Pickles Tails (Baobab Press, July 2020)

== Awards ==
He received the NCS Newspaper Comic Strip Award for 2001 for his work on the strip. In 2013, in a tie with Baby Blues co-creator Rick Kirkman, Crane received cartooning’s highest honor, the Reuben Award for Cartoonist of the Year, for Pickles.

== Personal life ==
Crane married his college sweetheart, Diana Long, and they have seven children. He is a member of the LDS Church and occasionally draws the church's temples or periodicals as background props in the Pickles comic strip. Crane lives in Sparks, Nevada.
