= Gene Weingarten =

American journalist (born 1951)

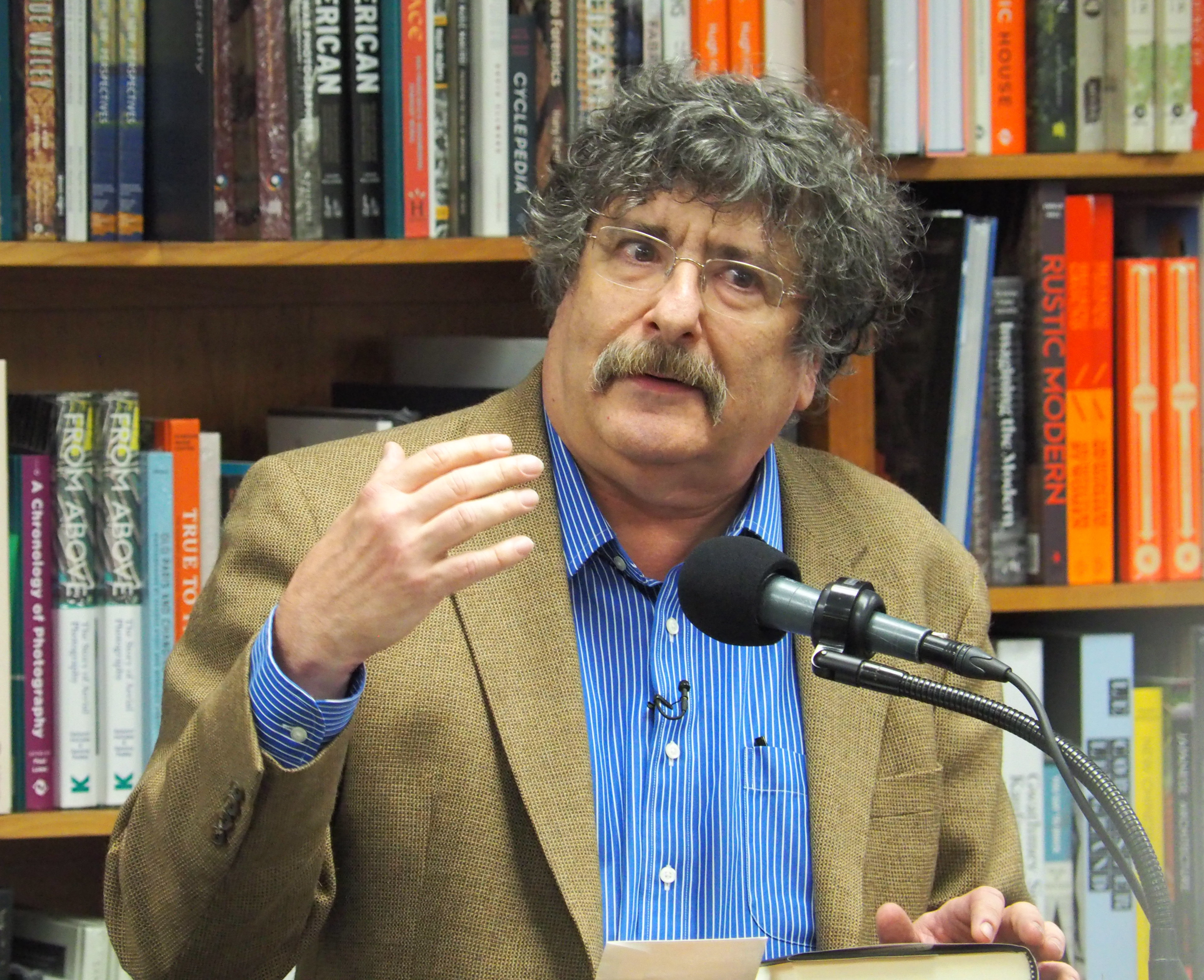
- Weingarten in 2019
- Born: October 2, 1951 (age 75); New York City, New York, U.S.
- Education: New York University
- Occupation: Writer
- Years active: 1972–present
- Employer: Formerly The Washington Post
- Children: Two

Gene Norman Weingarten (born October 2, 1951) is an American journalist and former syndicated humor columnist for The Washington Post. He is the only two-time winner of the Pulitzer Prize for Feature Writing. Weingarten is known for both his serious and humorous work. Through September 2021, Weingarten's column, "Below the Beltway," was published weekly in The Washington Post magazine and syndicated nationally by The Washington Post Writers Group. Weingarten and his son Dan also write Barney & Clyde, a comic strip with illustrations by David Clark.

== Early life and education ==
Gene Norman Weingarten was born in New York City. He is Jewish. He grew up in the southwest Bronx; his father was an accountant who worked as an Internal Revenue Service agent, and his mother was a schoolteacher. In 1968, Weingarten graduated from The Bronx High School of Science and attended New York University, where he started as a pre-med student but ended up majoring in psychology. He was editor of the NYU daily student newspaper, The Heights Daily News. Weingarten left college three credits short of a degree.

== Career ==
=== 1972–1990: Early work ===
In 1972, while still in college, Weingarten's story about gangs in the South Bronx was published as a cover story in New York Magazine.

Weingarten's first newspaper job was with the Albany, New York, Knickerbocker News, an afternoon daily.

In 1977, he went to work at the Detroit Free Press. Weingarten then moved back to New York City to work at The National Law Journal.

From 1981 to 1990, Weingarten was editor of the Miami Herald Sunday magazine, Tropic. In 1984, he hired Dave Barry, giving one of America's best-known humor columnists his big break. Tropic won two Pulitzer Prizes, including Barry's, during Weingarten's tenure. In 1984 he created the Herald Hunt, along with Barry and his later editor at the Washington Post, Tom Shroder, whom he referred to frequently in his online chats as "Tom the Butcher".

=== 1990–2019: starting at The Washington Post ===
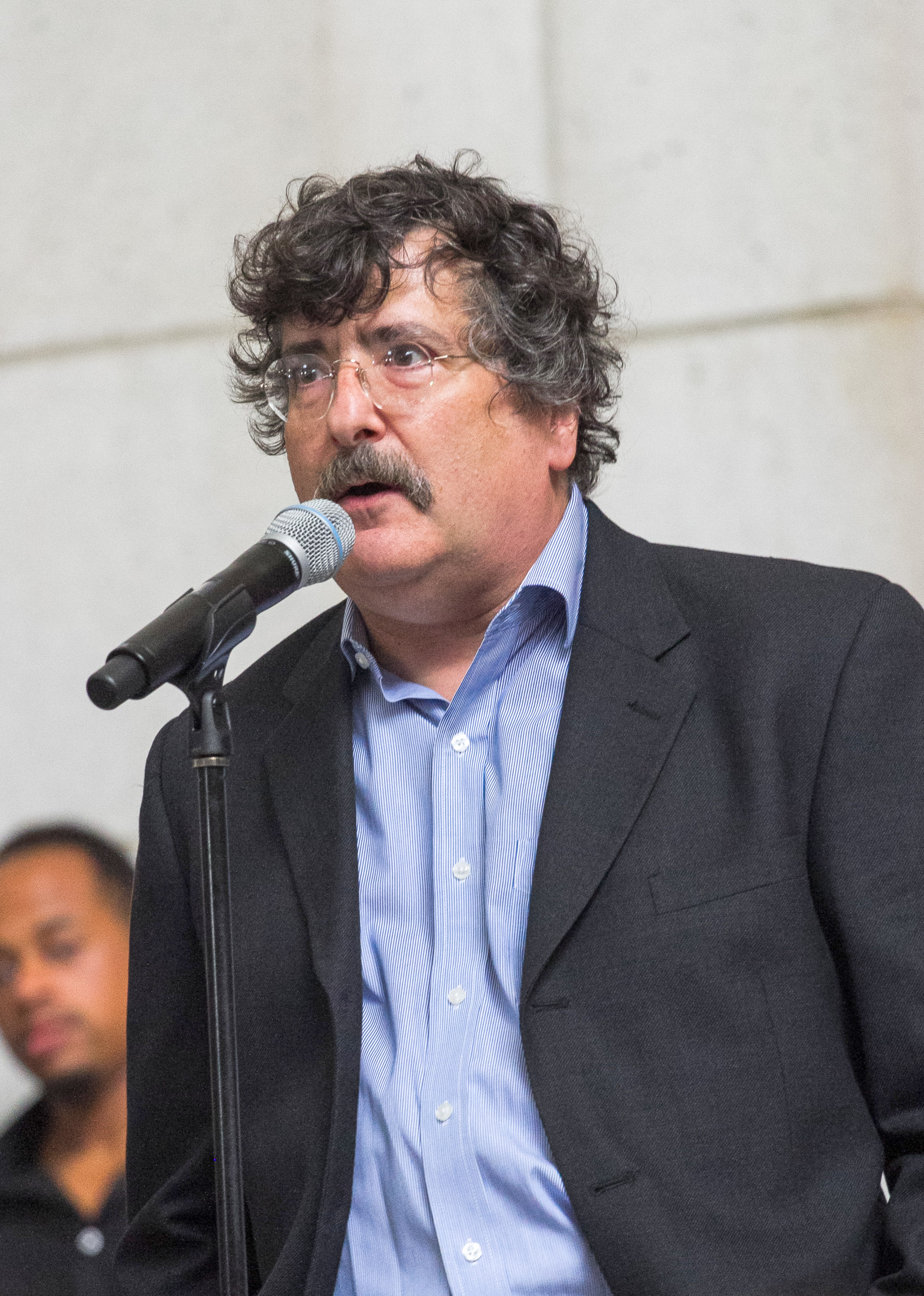
Weingarten in 2014

In 1990, Weingarten was hired by The Washington Post.

Weingarten wrote Below the Beltway, a weekly humor column for The Washington Post that was nationally syndicated, until 2021. Illustrator Eric Shansby contributed drawings to the column, which has been a long-term collaboration over 10 years. In 2007, for one of these columns, he humorously enhanced his Wikipedia entry until he was caught and the edits were reverted.

Weingarten hosted a popular Washington Post online chat called Chatological Humor, formerly known as "Tuesdays with Moron." Common topics in his online chat include the art of comic strips, analysis of humor, politics, philosophy, medicine, and gender differences. Many of his columns addressing gender differences have been written in a he-said, she-said style in collaboration with humorist Gina Barreca, his co-author for I'm with Stupid. It was during one of these chats he coined the phrase "Marrying Irving."

Starting in 1993, Weingarten created and edited the Style Invitational humor contest for The Washington Post. As part of the contest, he often hid his connection to the Invitational, using the pseudonym "The Czar." However, Weingarten admitted responsibility in 1999 and 2001, writing, "I run a reader-participation contest every Sunday in The Post. It is called The Style Invitational." He stopped editing the contest in 2003, handing it off to editor Pat Myers.

In 2005, one of Weingarten's in-house critiques was leaked online, where he said The Post was suffering a failure of imagination. Selected passages were later re-posted on his column.

In his live online chat on June 22, 2009, Weingarten disclosed that he had accepted a buyout offer from The Washington Post, which meant he was retiring as a longer-form feature writer. The frequency of his online chat was reduced from weekly to monthly. His column continued under a contract with The Post, but he stopped contributing feature-length articles. As of 2011, he was semi-retired from the paper, working on other projects.

=== 2019–present: One Day and moving to Substack ===
In October 2019, Weingarten published One Day, an exhaustive look into a random day in American history. The date was chosen by children picking numbers out of a hat: It was December 28, 1986. The premise was that "if you dig deeply enough, there is no such thing as an ordinary day." In 2019, it was ranked by Slate as one of the 50 best nonfiction books of the past 25 years.

He went into the idea of the book with NPR:

I went to a restaurant, brought [an] old green fedora. Inside were 63 crumpled pieces of paper — 31 on the first drawing, drawn by a little boy for the day of the year. 12 in the second one for the month the year, and 20 for the third one; I had limited the year to one of 20 years. I wanted people alive who I could talk to who remembered what happened. So we limited it to 1969 to 1989.... Journalists will tell you that the absolutely worst news day of the week is Sunday. And this was a Sunday. The absolutely worst news week of the year is the sleepy one between Christmas and New Year's, and at least at first glance, 1986 didn't ring any great news bells with me. We seemed to have the worst day of the week in the worst week of the year in a bad year.

His last chat at the Post was November 3, 2020, where he revealed that Chatalogical Humor had been cancelled, partially or wholly due to his public criticism of the Post's rollout of their new online chat software the previous week.

In the September 26, 2021 Washington Post Magazine, he wrote his last humor column, titled "The Short Goodbye", and in a follow-up comment stated that he was not retiring, just discontinuing his regular column. However, Weingarten announced via Twitter on December 8, 2021, that he and the Post could not come to terms on a new contract, and he was no longer writing for them. His final story was "A Dog’s Life: Why are so many people so cruel to their dogs? My search to understand a hidden scourge".

Weingarten launched his Substack blog in January 2023, where he posts regularly. On January 3, he brought back his weekly online chat (now three times a week, on Tuesdays, Thursdays and Saturdays). The same day, he also brought back the Style Invitational (albeit under the name The Invitational to avoid legal issues with the Post), which had been cancelled by the Post just days before his departure. It is now run by him and Pat Myers, who took over after his departure in 2003.

== Other work ==
=== The Hypochondriac's Guide To Life. And Death ===
Weingarten is a self-acknowledged hypochondriac. He was diagnosed with what was then a near-fatal infection of Hepatitis C, which led to the publication his first book, 1998's The Hypochondriac's Guide To Life. And Death.

=== I'm with Stupid: One Man, One Woman ===
Weingarten co-wrote a series of humor columns in The Washington Post with feminist writer Gina Barreca about the differences between men and women. These became the basis of the 2004 book she and Weingarten collaborated on called I'm with Stupid: One Man. One Woman. 10,000 Years Of Misunderstandings Between The Sexes Cleared Right Up. The two wrote for over two years via email and on the phone without having met in person. They eventually met for the first time while doing publicity for the book. The book is illustrated by cartoonist Richard Thompson.

=== Old Dogs: Are the Best Dogs ===
In fall of 2008, Weingarten published Old Dogs: Are the Best Dogs in collaboration with photographer Michael S. Williamson. Together they profiled and photographed 63 dogs between the ages of 10 and 17 years old over the course of two and a half years. In response to the inevitable question of which dogs remained alive, Weingarten has asserted that the answer will always be "all of them." Weingarten's inspiration for Old Dogs came shortly after the death of his dog, Harry S Truman, who is also featured in the book.

=== Barney & Clyde ===
In June 2010, Weingarten and his son Dan began publishing the syndicated comic strip Barney & Clyde, illustrated by David Clark. The comic is about the friendship between billionaire, J. Barnard Pillsbury, and a homeless man named Clyde Finster. The comic took over five years to develop, with the Miami Herald, The Washington Post, and the Chicago Tribune early supporters.

=== Me & Dog ===
In September 2014, Weingarten published Me & Dog, a picture book, in collaboration with illustrator Eric Shansby. The book is about a young boy Sid and his dog, Murphy. It is said to be the first atheist-themed children's book. Weingarten said he wrote the book in response to the lack of literature geared towards children and atheism − and a counterbalance to the prevalence of books like Heaven Is for Real.

=== Unproduced work ===
In addition, Weingarten has written three screenplays, one in collaboration with humorist Dave Barry and two in collaboration with David Simon, including B Major, about a piano marathon conducted in Scranton in 1970. None of the screenplays has yet been produced.

== Awards ==
From 1987 to 1988, Weingarten was a fellow at the Nieman Foundation for Journalism at Harvard University.

In 2006, Weingarten won the Missouri Lifestyle Journalism Award for Multicultural Journalism for his Washington Post Magazine feature article Snowbound.

In 2008, Weingarten was awarded the Pulitzer Prize for Feature Writing for his Washington Post story, "Pearls Before Breakfast," "his chronicling of a world-class violinist (Joshua Bell) who, as an experiment, played beautiful music in a subway station filled with unheeding commuters." The night Weingarten returned from accepting his Pulitzer Prize, he received an email from a librarian named Paul Musgrave from the Richard Nixon Presidential Library, who told him that he had recently seen an article about a similar experiment that the Chicago Evening Post did in May 1930 where they had the virtuoso Jacques Gordon play his Stradivarius violin outside a subway station to see if commuters would notice the music. The article, entitled "Famous Fiddler in Disguise Gets $5.61 in Curb Concerts," showed commuters displaying the same disinterest as Weingarten described in his article. It turns out Joshua Bell had owned that same Stradivarius violin for over 10 years.

In 2010, Weingarten was awarded a second Pulitzer Prize for Feature Writing for his Washington Post story, "Fatal Distraction," "his haunting story about parents, from varying walks of life, who accidentally kill their children by forgetting them in cars." Weingarten said he had a lucky break when his daughter was younger when he almost left her behind in the car when they lived in Florida.

In 2014, Weingarten was awarded the National Society of Newspaper Columnists' Ernie Pyle Lifetime Achievement Award.

== Personal life ==
Weingarten has lived in many places on the East Coast. His first residence in the Washington D.C. area was in Bethesda, Maryland. Starting in 2001 he has lived in the Capitol Hill neighborhood of Washington, D.C., with his wife, Arlene Reidy, an attorney, but in a column published August 10, 2017, announced that the marriage had collapsed. He has since made several references to a girlfriend in online chats, and at least one column, and in his chat of June 2, 2019, revealed that his girlfriend was Rachel Manteuffel, a 36-year-old editor and fellow writer for The Washington Post. He has two children, Molly Weingarten, a veterinarian, and Dan Weingarten, a cartoonist.

Weingarten has stated he is an atheist. He is an amateur horologist.

== Works and publications ==
Books

- Weingarten, Gene; Barry, Dave (introduction); Staake, Bob (illustrations) (1998). The Hypochondriac's Guide to Life and Death. New York: Simon & Schuster. ISBN 978-0-684-85280-5. OCLC 39347929.
- Weingarten, Gene; Barreca, Regina; Thompson, Richard (illustrations) (2004). I'm with Stupid: One Man, One Woman: 10,000 Years of Misunderstanding between the Sexes Cleared Right Up. New York: Simon & Schuster. ISBN 978-0-7432-4420-6. OCLC 53285202.
- Weingarten, Gene; Williamson, Michael (photographs) (2008). Old Dogs: Are the Best Dogs. New York, NY: Simon & Schuster. ISBN 978-1-4165-3499-0. OCLC 156975381.
- Weingarten, Gene (2010). The Fiddler in the Subway: The True Story of What Happened When a World-Class Violinist Played for Handouts -- and Other Virtuoso Performances by America's Foremost Feature Writer. New York: Simon & Schuster. ISBN 978-1-4391-8160-7. OCLC 891943904.
- Weingarten, Gene; Shansby, Eric (illustrations) (2014). Me & Dog. New York: Simon & Schuster Books for Young Readers. ISBN 978-1-4424-9414-5. OCLC 906830301.
- Weingarten, Gene (2019). One Day. New York: Blue Rider Press. ISBN 978-0-3991-6666-2.

Selected articles

- Weingarten, Gene (March 27, 1972). "Are You Ready for the New, Ultra-Violent Street Gang?". New York Magazine.
- Weingarten, Gene (July 19, 1998). "Tears for Audrey". The Washington Post.
- Weingarten, Gene (August 9, 1998). "The Hardy Boys The Final Chapter ..." The Washington Post.
- Weingarten, Gene (February 11, 2001). "If You Go Chasing Rabbits ..." The Washington Post. Archived from the original on October 30, 2010.
- Weingarten, Gene (August 22, 2004). "Fear Itself: Learning to live in the age of terrorism". The Washington Post. Archived from the original on October 30, 2010.
- Weingarten, Gene (May 1, 2005). "Snowbound". The Washington Post.
- Weingarten, Gene (January 22, 2006). "The Peekaboo Paradox". The Washington Post.
- Weingarten, Gene (April 8, 2007). "Pearls Before Breakfast: Can one of the nation's great musicians cut through the fog of a D.C. rush hour? Let's find out". The Washington Post.
- Weingarten, Gene (March 8, 2009). "Fatal Distraction: Forgetting a Child in the Backseat of a Car Is a Horrifying Mistake. Is It a Crime?". The Washington Post.
- Weingarten, Gene (December 5, 2012). "Since 1979, Brian Murtagh has fought to keep convicted murderer Jeffrey MacDonald in prison". The Washington Post.

== See also ==
- Barney & Clyde
