= Watch Your Head =

American comic strip by Cory Thomas

- Author(s): Cory Thomas
- Website: watchthecomic.com
- Current status/schedule: Monday, Thursday
- Launch date: March 19, 2006
- Genre(s): College, Humor

Watch Your Head is a webcomic and former daily syndicated comic strip written and illustrated by Cory Thomas, focusing on the lives of six students at a fictional historically black university. Based upon Thomas' experiences as a student at Howard University, Watch Your Head was first published in Howard's newspaper, The Hilltop.

The strip was picked up for national distribution by the Washington Post Writers Group (WPWG) in 2006, and was launched on March 27.

Watch Your Head ended as a newspaper strip June 1, 2014. It returned online as a three-strip-a-week webcomic on August 4, 2014. The new strip starts over at a similar, but different, university with many tweaks to the main characters and a nearly absent role for the former protagonist, Cory. On January 9, 2015, Thomas announced that he was scaling back the strip to twice a week.

== Characters ==
Watch Your Head's main protagonist is Cory, an intelligent, yet somewhat socially awkward, young freshman at historically black Oliver Otis University. Other characters featured in the strip include Cory's three best friends: anti-social Black nationalist Omar, preacher's son-turned-womanizer and self-proclaimed ladies man Quincy, and Kevin, one of the few white students at Otis. Also appearing are Cory's shady former roommate Jason, his on-again/off-again love interest Robin, Robin's best friend (and Kevin's girlfriend, later wife) Dana, and Cory's one-time girlfriend January.

Jason pretends to be a streetwise thug, but the truth is that he is the spoiled brat of doting rich parents and he makes things difficult for poor Cory. Kevin is at Otis on an ice hockey scholarship, but he is much more of an artist than an athlete. Kevin and Cory share an enthusiasm for comic books. Self-centered Robin was completely unaware of how much Cory adored her, and when she finally realized it, she sent him back to January.

With the strip's webcomic reboot in 2014, Kevin became the lead character in an altered version of the strip's universe (the final newspaper strips from May 2014 make intentional reference to DC Comics' Crisis on Infinite Earths comic book maxiseries). The webcomic version of Watch Your Head takes place at Douglass University, where Kevin has transferred from his engineering school in Canada after presumably being in a long-distance relationship with Robin, only to find that he had been "catfished" by Dana. Quincy, Omar, and January (now Omar's girlfriend) also appear, while Cory has only made off-panel appearances over video chat with Robin. Dana is unhappily married to Jason—at a distance—and her relationship with Kevin is developing as of early 2015.

== Plot ==
In recent events, Cory has met a new friend, January, who has an interest in magic, and works in a dentist's office as an office assistant. Kevin has been dating Robin's roommate Dana, who is smarter than Robin and not as attractive. There have been problems, due to Dana's insistence on keeping the relationship under wraps, and also with the appearance of Kevin's high school girlfriend, Lisa. Omar, whom Kevin stays with, has also taken exception to Kevin and Dana's interracial relationship, and has tried to steal Dana behind Kevin's back, even though he doesn't truly like her. This has come to a head in a recent comic, and has yet to be resolved. It has also been revealed that Omar was adopted by a white mother and Asian father, and faced many problems growing up due to his ethnicity. He was once painfully bitten by a little girl classmate who thought he was made of chocolate.

After spending the summer together, Cory and January started dating. Meanwhile, Robin gained a considerable amount of weight due to a break-up with her boyfriend, Steve, after she called all of the girls' numbers on his cell phone.

Also in recent comics, Ericka, Quincy's on-and-off girlfriend, recently told Quincy that she was pregnant with his child. As a result, Quincy decided to take responsibility for this baby and they were almost married, but Ericka confessed that she had faked the pregnancy, and the wedding was called off.

In recent strips, Corey had still not shown affection to January, and was showing interest in Robin, and there were hints that he was going to mess up his budding relationship (in typical Corey fashion). January kissed Cory, finally. This made Cory forget about Robin. It made him re-evaluate his views of Life, the Universe, and himself.

It has been shown in recent comics, that Omar has somehow lost his apartment, and is now the roommate of Jason. The two have been shown butting heads, especially since Omar has killed Jason's "pet" mouse, Edgar. However, unlike Cory, Omar has held his own against Jason. Also, Kevin and Cory have become roommates. There is, however, a potential that Kevin and Cory might clash due to the presence of Dana (a sort of Yoko Ono) in their apartment. It is also mentioned that Quincy's on/off again girlfriend, Erika, was in some type of online relationship with Omar, which caused a fight between Quincy and Omar, which was never fully resolved to this point in the strip. It has also been shown that January has broken up with Cory, who then started to date Robin, but later broke up with Robin after the assumed death of January in late 2012. Quincy had graduated and Omar found out he has a twin sister named LeLani, who Cory has a strong interest in. Dana and Kevin have also gotten married. At the end of the strip, it is shown that Omar, after having an emotional breakdown, and a therapy session with Robin, has taken to "opening himself to the world", and embracing life, and Kevin and Dana leaving for Canada to start a family. Also Jason has forsaken his fake thug imagery for the life of an emerging businessman, reuniting with his friend Peeno after a brief estrangement. Quincy has moved in with his girlfriend and her son to be a responsible adult, and Robin finally acknowledges her love of Corey, at the least on a friendship level.
