= Fort Knox (comic strip) =

American comic strip

- Author: Paul Jon Boscacci
- Current status/schedule: discontinued
- Launch date: October 5, 2009
- End date: The last daily strip ran 19 October 2024, and the last Sunday strip ran weekend of 9-10 November 2024.
- Syndicate(s): The Washington Post Writers Group
- Genre(s): Humor, the military

Fort Knox is a nationally syndicated comic strip written and drawn by Paul Jon Boscacci. It centers on the life of the Knox family: Major Joe Knox, his wife Jane Knox and his two sons, Donald and Wesley. The family has moved to fictional Fort Lincoln, where they must adjust to a new base, a new town and a new school.

The strip was picked up for syndication by the Washington Post Writers Group in October 2009. The strip's art has been used by the USO for a CARE package coloring contest and has been featured on the US Army website as well.

After fifteen years of publication, Fort Knox published its final installments on October 19, 2024, and the last Sunday strip ran the weekend of November 9-10, 2024.

== Characters and story ==
Joe Knox
Husband to Jane and father of Donald and Wesley. Joe's job has moved the family many times, and it sends him away on assignments while everyone else stays home. He knows that a strong bond will keep his family together through these tough tours of duty. But his attempts to strengthen that bond tend to fail with his sons, who, despite their dad's dreams of reliving his years as a college athlete, appear to be allergic to sports. Although Joe is a little macho and old-fashioned, deep down, this stern officer is a big softy.

Jane Knox
Wife to Joe, mother of Donald and Wesley. Jane has sacrificed a lot for her family, though she rarely acknowledges it. Military life means frequent upheaval, often just when she's making new friends. And since the Army sends Joe off on lengthy assignments, she sometimes feels like she's running a single-parent household.

Donald Knox
Megalomaniacal older son of Jane and Joe, and brother to Wesley. Donald is fearless, more confident than is wise, and is currently creating a long-term strategy for complete and total world domination. Because domination begins at home, his first plan is to overthrow his father. Donald believes in dressing for success, so he has worn a tie and carried a briefcase to school since kindergarten. His Achilles' heel is Fidel, his teddy bear, who he is convinced is out to get him.

Wesley Knox
Anxious, asthmatic younger son of Jane and Joe, brother to Donald. Wesley is afraid of spiders, snakes, monsters under the bed, sports, girls and, well, everything. The question is, do the fears manifest because of the constant changes he must face? Or do the constant changes cause the fears? In either case, at least he knows he can rely on his brother's protection, as long as he makes it worth Donald's while.

Fidel
Donald's plush bear and henchman. Fidel is the strong, silent type. He has survived getting lost in the mall and being attacked by Betty's dog. Donald believes Fidel is a dangerous fiend who needs to be shown who's boss.

Pearl Knox
Mother of Joe, tormentor of all. Pearl lives at the Happy Trails Senior Center, although she's a frequent visitor at the Knox household. Her paranoia drives her there, and then away again. She trusts no one, not even her grandchildren. But this is not an age-related phenomenon. She's always been like this, which may explain why Joe entered a profession that would send him far from home so often.

General Wickum
Commander of Fort Lincoln. A Vietnam vet who has made the Army his life, the general is a rather fatherly superior officer to Joe. He offers kind, thoughtful advice, much of it useless. He's a widower and a bit lonely, but he's never attracted to women who would make good general's wives.

Major Frank Tucker
Joe's fellow officer and friend. Frank has been in the Army longer than Joe and has the emotional scars to prove it. Joe looks to Frank for help in coping with the demands of military life, which might not be a smart decision on Joe's part.

Kurt the Bully
Schoolmate of Donald and Wesley. Like a shark, he's attracted to the sick and weak (see Wesley). Wesley, at least, understands that like most bullies, Kurt's swagger belies his self-esteem issues and problems at home. But that knowledge doesn't help Wesley's wallet at all.

Betty Wu
Classmate to Donald, love interest of Wesley. Betty's father is a dentist who expects her to become one, too. She is American-born Chinese and will, no doubt, rebel against her parents' strict traditions. She is tough and doesn't put up with Donald's Napoleon complex, despite the fact that she kind of likes him.
