= Gina Barreca =

American academic and humorist

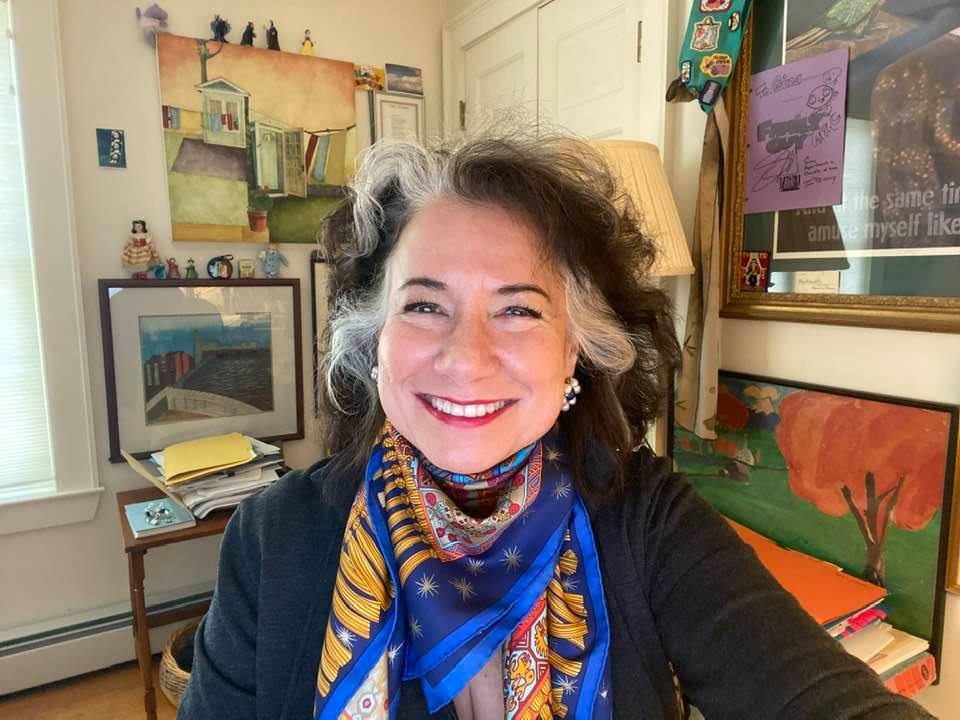
- Barreca working from home during the pandemic
- Born: Regina Barreca; 1957 (age 68–69)
- Education: Dartmouth College, New Hall, Cambridge, City University of New York
- Spouse: Michael Meyer
- Website: GinaBarreca.com

Regina Barreca (born 1957) is an American academic and humorist. She is a Board of Trustees Distinguished Professor of English literature and feminist theory at the University of Connecticut and winner of UConn's highest award for excellence in teaching. She is the author of ten books, including the best selling They Used to Call Me Snow White But I Drifted: Women's Strategic Use of Humor (Viking/Humor) and editor of 13 others. Her work has appeared in The New York Times, The Independent of London, The Chronicle of Higher Education, Cosmopolitan, and The Harvard Business Review; for 20 years she wrote columns for various Tribune newspapers as well as a series of cover stories for the Chicago Tribune. She is a member of the New York Friar's Club and an honoree of the Connecticut Women's Hall of Fame.

== Early life and education ==
Barreca grew up in Brooklyn and Long Island, New York, and is of Italian descent. She was the first woman to be named Alumni Scholar at Dartmouth College, where she earned her 1979 bachelor's degree. Her stories from this time can be found in her memoir, Babes in Boyland: A Personal History of Co-education in the Ivy League.

She was a Reynolds Fellow and earned her 1981 M.A. at New Hall, Cambridge University, and earned her 1987 Ph.D. (English Literature) from the Graduate School, City University of New York, dissertation: "Hate and Humor in Women's Literature: Twentieth-Century British Writers.".

== Career ==
=== Professor ===
From 1981 to 1987, Barreca was a Graduate Assistant/Adjunct Lecturer at Queens College. In 1987 she became an assistant professor of English at the University of Connecticut, where she became an associate professor of English in 1991. From 1997 on she has been Professor of English. She has also been a Reed Fellow for English Language and Literature at UConn since 2017. As of 2018, she has received the American Association of University Professors Excellence in Research and Creativity: Career Award, and was named the Board of Trustees Distinguished Professor of English Literature.

=== Author ===
==== Articles and other publications ====
She is currently a blogger for Psychology Today, where she has over 7.5 million views.

Barreca has also published articles in The New York Times, The Philadelphia Inquirer, The Atlanta Journal-Constitution, the Chicago Tribune, The Dartmouth Alumni Magazine, The Orlando Sentinel, Ms. magazine, and The Chronicle of Higher Education.

Barreca cowrote a series of humor columns in The Washington Post with Gene Weingarten about the differences between men and women. These became the basis of the book she wrote with Weingarten, I'm with Stupid: One Man. One Woman. 10,000 Years of Misunderstanding Between the Sexes Cleared Right Up. They worked for two years via email and on the phone without having met first.

Barreca appeared in Milton Friedman's documentary Free to Choose - Episode 6, as a student for Dartmouth College.

==== Books ====
In 2011, Barreca published a memoir about being one of the first classes of women at Dartmouth College titled Babes in Boyland: A Personal History of Co-education in the Ivy League.

=== Speaker ===
She has served as an advisor to the Library of Congress for work on humor and the American character, and was deemed a "feminist humor maven" by Ms. magazine.

== Personal ==
Barreca married her husband, Michael Meyer, in 1991. They live in Storrs, Connecticut.

== Works and publications ==
=== Books written ===
- "If You Lean In, Will Men Just Look Down Your Blouse?" (2016), ISBN 978-1-250-06074-7
- It's Not That I'm Bitter, or How I Learned to Stop Worrying About Visible Panty Lines and Conquered the World (2009), ISBN 978-0-312-54726-4
- Babes in Boyland: A Personal History of Co-education in the Ivy League (2005), ISBN 978-1-58465-299-1
- I'm with Stupid (2004), ISBN 978-0-7432-4420-6, co-written with Gene Weingarten
- An ABC of Vice: An Insatiable Woman's Guide (2003), ISBN 978-0-939883-11-0, illustrated by Nicole Hollander
- Too Much of a Good Thing is Wonderful (2000), ISBN 978-0-939883-06-6
- Sweet Revenge: The Wicked Delights of Getting Even (1995), ISBN 978-0-425-15766-4
- Untamed and Unabashed: Essays on Women and Humor in British Literature (1994), ISBN 978-0-8143-2136-2
- Perfect Husbands (and Other Fairy Tales) (1993), ISBN 978-0-385-47538-9
- They Used to Call Me Snow White...But I Drifted: Women's Strategic Use of Humor (1991), ISBN 978-0-14-016835-8

=== Books edited ===
- Fast Fallen Women (2023), ISBN 978-1-954-907-78-2
- Fast Fierce Women (2022), ISBN 978-1-954-907-00-3
- Fast Funny Women (2021), ISBN 978-1-949-116-20-5
- Make Mine A Double: Why Women Like Us Like to Drink (or Not) (2011), ISBN 978-1-58465-759-0
- The Signet Book of American Humor (2004), ISBN 978-0-451-21058-6
- Don't Tell Mama: The Penguin Book of Italian American Writing (2002), ISBN 978-0-14-200247-6
- A Sit-down with the Sopranos: Watching Italian American Culture on TV's Most Talked About Series (2002), ISBN 978-0-312-29528-8
- The Erotics of Instruction (1997), ISBN 978-0-87451-806-1
- The Penguin Book of Women's Humor (1996), ISBN 978-0-14-017294-2
- Desire and Imagination: 20 Classic Essays in Sexuality (1995), ISBN 978-0-452-01150-2
- Fay Weldon's Wicked Fictions (1994)
- New Perspectives on Women and Comedy (1992), ISBN 978-2-88124-533-6
- Sex and Death in Victorian Literature (1990), ISBN 978-0-253-31015-6
- Last Laughs (1988) ISBN 978-0677220208

=== Books introduced ===
- Dorothy Parker. Complete Stories Colleen Bresse (Editor), Regina Barreca (Introduction) ISBN 978-0142437216
- Louisa May. Little Women Regina Barreca (Introduction), Susan Straight (Afterword) ISBN 978-0593198025

=== Honorary degrees and awards ===
In 2000, she received an honorary degree from Shepard's College in West Virginia. She received an honorary degree from Manchester Community College in 2014, and honorary Doctorate of Human Letters, Charter Oak State College, Connecticut in 2016.
