= The Omnificent English Dictionary in Limerick Form =

Online dictionary

- Website type: Dictionary
- Available in: English
- Website: www.oedilf.com
- Launched: May 2004; 22 years ago

The Omnificent English Dictionary In Limerick Form (The OEDILF) is an open collaborative project to compile an English dictionary whose entries take the form of limericks. The project was originally called the "Oxford English Dictionary in Limerick Form," but the name was changed after the OED's legal department advised against it. The site, launched in May 2004, has attracted over 2,260 writers from around the world. The project has amassed more than 120,275 limericks. The project progresses alphabetically and is currently accepting limericks on words beginning with the letters Aa- through Ir-.

In June 2025, the estimated date of completion of The OEDILF was 16 February 2066. This will be a "first edition", a first pass through words in the English language. Work will move on to limericks for words that were skipped in the first pass and for words that were coined during the writing of the first edition.

The OEDILF has been featured on National Public Radio in the United States, on BBC Radio 4 in the UK, on CBC radio in Canada, and in the pages of the Washington Post, the Glasgow Herald, and various other newspapers. It was also named one of PC Magazine's Top 99 Undiscovered Websites of 2006.

== Contributors ==
The project was initiated in 2004 by Chris J. Strolin. With the assistance of contributors, by May 2023 the project had amassed more than 120,275 limericks. Strolin has set a personal goal of writing at least one limerick per day, and by May 2023 he had created 10,005 limericks. The project's most prolific writer has 11,651 limericks, 25 others have written more than 1,000, and the contributions of some 150 other "OEDILFers" range from 100 to 900 limericks each. Many have written a handful, and new authors are welcome.

== An example of a limerick on OEDILF ==
Here's the very first limerick written for OEDILF, written by Chris J. Strolin for the word "a". Along with the limerick is an "author's note". Many limericks have an author's note.

The very first word here is a.
It's used with a noun to convey
A singular notion
Like "a duck" or "a potion"
Or top notch as when used in "Grade A."

This limerick, written well before the official 10 May 2004 kick-off
of The OEDILF Project, and certainly not one of our best, was the first piece ever specifically written for The OEDILF way back when all this was nothing more than a running joke.
