= Darrin Bell =

American editorial cartoonist and comic strip creator (born 1975)

- Born: January 27, 1975 (age 51) Los Angeles, California, U.S.
- Areas: Editorial cartoonist, comic strip writer/artist
- Notable works: Candorville; Rudy Park
- Spouse: Makeda Rashidi
- Children: 4

Darrin Lawrence Bell (born January 27, 1975) is a Pulitzer Prize-winning American editorial cartoonist and comic strip creator known for the syndicated satirical comic strips Candorville and Rudy Park.

Bell is the first African American to have two comic strips syndicated nationally and to win a Pulitzer Prize for editorial cartooning. He is also a storyboard artist. Bell engages in issues such as civil rights, pop culture, family, science fiction, scriptural wisdom, and nihilist philosophy, while often casting his characters in roles that are traditionally denied to them.

Bell was arrested in 2025 under suspicion of having uploaded and possessed child pornography, including of real children and AI-generated children. He is the first person to be charged under a California law criminalizing AI-generated child sexual abuse material.

== Biography ==
Bell, who is black and Jewish, was born in Los Angeles, California. He started drawing when he was three. He is the son of a black father and a Jewish mother, both of whom are public school teachers. Bell grew up in Los Angeles in the 1980s and 1990s, and experienced bullying in his youth due to his interracial identity. He attended the University of California, Berkeley, graduating with a BA in political science in 1999. While at Cal, Bell became the editorial cartoonist for The Daily Californian. Bell's freelance editorial cartooning career began in 1995 at age 20. His first sale was to the Los Angeles Times, which subsequently assigned him a cartoon every other week. Bell also sold his cartoons to the San Francisco Chronicle and the former BANG (Bay Area News Group) papers, which included the Oakland Tribune.

Bell's strip Candorville, launched in September 2003 by The Washington Post Writers Group (WPWG), features young black and Latino characters living in the inner city. Using the vehicle of humor, Candorville presents social and political commentary as well as the stories of its protagonists. Candorville grew out of a comic strip called Lemont Brown, which appeared in the student newspaper of UC Berkeley, The Daily Californian, from 1993 to 2003. It was that newspaper's longest-running comic strip. Candorville appears in more than 100 of America's newspapers.

Bell also drew Rudy Park, a syndicated comic strip created by Theron Heir and Bell that was distributed by United Feature Syndicate and then the WPWG. Heir, a.k.a. Matt Richtel, wrote the strip from 2001 to 2012, when he announced he would be taking a year-long sabbatical to focus on other projects. Bell at that point took over the writing duties as well as illustrating the strip, which ended print syndication in June 2018, although it continues to appear sporadically (now distributed by Counterpoint Media). In 2023, Bell's autobiographical hardback graphic novel The Talk was published. It combined his life story with some common tropes of the American civil rights narrative.

== Personal life ==
Bell currently resides in Sacramento County, California and is divorced from Makeda Rashidi. They have four children.

=== Child pornography investigation and arrest ===
On January 15, 2025, Bell was arrested by the Sacramento County Sheriff's Office under suspicion of having possessed child pornography, according to Internet Crimes Against Children detectives tipped off by the National Center for Missing and Exploited Children. In a search of Bell's home, investigators stated that they found 134 videos of child pornography linked to an account owned and controlled by Bell, some of which was computer generated.

After his arrest, Bell's Candorville strip was suspended by The Washington Post and other outlets. Bell was also suspended from Counterpoint Media's daily newsletter.

== Awards ==
Bell was given the 2019 Pulitzer Prize for Editorial Cartooning. In addition to the awards listed below, Bell's work won several California Intercollegiate Press Association awards and an SPJ Mark of Excellence Award, and he was a two-time runner-up for the Charles M. Schulz Award, as well as a runner-up for the Locher Award.

- 2015: Robert F. Kennedy Journalism Award for Editorial Cartooning
- 2016: Clifford K. & James T. Berryman Award for Editorial Cartoons
- 2019: Pulitzer Prize for Editorial Cartooning
- 2024: Andrew Carnegie Medals for Excellence, finalist for The Talk

== Publications ==
- Bell, Darrin; Heir, Theron (2003). The People Must Be Wired (Rudy Park). Andrews McMeel. ISBN 978-0-7407-3807-4.
- Bell, Darrin; Heir, Theron (2004). Peace, Love, and Lattes (Rudy Park). Andrews McMeel. ISBN 978-0-7407-4662-8.
- Bell, Darrin (2005). Thank God for Culture Clash (Candorville). Andrews McMeel. ISBN 978-0-7407-5442-5.
- Bell, Darrin (2006). Another Stereotype Bites the Dust (Candorville). Andrews McMeel. ISBN 978-0-7407-6041-9.
- Bell, Darrin (2010). Katrina's Ghost (Candorville). BellCartoons.com. ISBN 978-0-557-17833-9.
- Bell, Darrin (2011). The Starbucks at the End of the World (Candorville). BellCartoons.com. ISBN 978-1-4583-2833-5.
- Bell, Darrin (2023). The Talk. Henry Holt. ISBN 978-1250805140.

=== Interviews ===
- Interview with Tony Dokoupil, Newsweek (January 19, 2008)
- Interview with Comics Coast to Coast (April 28, 2008)
- Interview with Michael A. Ventrella (August 2011)
- Interview with Michael Cavna, The Washington Post (August 20, 2014)
- Interview with Michael Cavna, The Washington Post (December 4, 2014)
