= David Clark (cartoonist) =

American illustrator

David Clark is an American illustrator who has produced work for newspapers. He received the National Cartoonist Society Newspaper Illustration Award for 1996 for his work. He has illustrated several children's books. He is the illustrator and co-creator of the syndicated comic strip Barney & Clyde, which debuted on June 7, 2010.
