= GoComics =

Comic strips website

- Website type: Comics
- Founded: 2005; 21 years ago
- Owner: Andrews McMeel Universal
- Website: www.gocomics.com
- Commercial: Yes
- Registration: Optional

GoComics is a website launched in 2005 by the digital entertainment provider Uclick. It was originally created as a distribution portal for comic strips on mobile phones, but in 2006, the site was redesigned and expanded to include online strips and cartoons. GoComics publishes editorial cartoons, mobile content, and daily comics. It is currently owned by Andrews McMeel Universal.

Comics are currently arranged into feature pages, which display the latest comic strips within a 14-day archive for non-users, a 30-day archive for registered members, or the entire archive for Premium members. Other features such as descriptions of strip characters, biographical information about cartoonists and links to other recommended feature pages are often included.

As of 2016, GoComics had more than 44,000 subscribers worldwide. In addition to the contents of the page on the site, users can have strips emailed to them daily for free. Users can also comment on, collect, tag, and share their favorite comics.

In 2025, the website was completely redesigned, and the price for full access to the comic archive (as well as games and puzzles) for premium subscribers was set at $4.99 per month or $34.99 per year, effective on April 1. A major part of the update was the addition of a paywall, with access to the comic strip archives currently limited to only the last two weeks for non-registered users and 30 days for registered free users, which has been criticized by many users.

== GoComics strips and panels ==
The following are some, but not all, of the comic strips and panels GoComics features:

- The Academia Waltz
- Adam@home
- Agnes
- Andertoons
- Animal Crackers
- Andy Capp
- Annie
- Arctic Circle
- The Argyle Sweater
- Art by Moga
- Ask a Cat
- Ask Shagg
- The Awkward Yeti
- B.C.
- Back in the Day
- Bad Reporter
- Baldo
- Ballard Street
- Banana Triangle
- Barkeater Lake
- Basic Instructions
- Big Nate
- Bleeker: The Rechargeable Dog
- Bloom County
- Bob the Squirrel
- The Boondocks
- Bozo
- Breaking Cat News
- The Buckets
- Brenda Starr, Reporter
- Brevity
- Brewster Rockit: Space Guy!
- Broom-Hilda
- Buckles
- Calvin and Hobbes
- Candorville
- The Cardinal
- Cathy
- Cat's Cafe
- C'est la Vie
- Citizen Dog
- The City
- Cleats
- Compu-toon
- Close to Home
- Cornered
- Crabgrass
- Cul de Sac
- Daddy's Home
- Dark Side of the Horse
- Dick Tracy
- Dilbert (removed in February 2023)
- The Dinette Set
- Dog eat Doug
- Doonesbury
- Drive
- The Duplex
- The Flying McCoys
- For Better or For Worse
- Four Eyes
- Fowl Language
- FoxTrot
- Frank and Ernest
- Frankie Comics
- Frazz
- Fred Basset
- Frog Applause
- The Fusco Brothers
- Garfield
- Gaturro
- Gasoline Alley
- Get a Life
- Get Fuzzy
- Gil Thorp
- Ginger Meggs
- Ham Shears
- Heart of the City
- Heathcliff
- Hubris!
- Incidental Comics
- Ink Pen
- InSecurity
- Invisible Bread
- Jane's World
- Jim's Journal
- Joe and Monkey
- La Cucaracha
- Lay Lines
- Liberty Meadows
- Lil Miesters
- Liō
- Luann
- Maintaining
- Mannequin on the Moon
- Marmaduke
- The Meaning of Lila
- Momma
- Mother Goose and Grimm
- Mt. Pleasant (until 2023)
- Mutt and Jeff
- New Adventures of Queen Victoria
- Non Sequitur
- The Norm
- Nancy
- Nancy Classics
- Oh, Brother!
- Ollie and Quentin
- One Big Happy
- Opus
- Overboard
- Ozy and Millie
- Peanuts
- Peanuts Begins
- Pearls Before Swine
- Phoebe and Her Unicorn
- Pibgorn
- Pickles
- Pluggers
- Pooch Café
- Poorly Drawn Lines
- Poptropica (redirects to game)
- PreTeena
- Prickly City
- Rabbits Against Magic
- Real Life Adventures
- Red and Rover
- Red Meat
- Ripley's Believe It or Not!
- Sarah's Scribbles
- Savage Chickens
- Sherman's Lagoon
- Shoe
- Shoecabbage
- Shortcuts
- Skin Horse
- Skippy
- Slowpoke
- Speed Bump
- Spot the Frog
- Starslip
- Stone Soup
- Tank McNamara
- Thatababy
- The Wandering Melon
- Tiny Sepuku
- Tom the Dancing Bug
- UFO
- Up and Out
- U.S. Acres (until 2020)
- Wallace the Brave
- Watch Your Head
- Wee Pals
- Winnie the Pooh
- The Wizard of Id
- Working Daze
- Wrong Hands
- Wumo
- Yenny
- Ziggy

== Editorial cartoonists ==
- Lalo Alcaraz
- Nick Anderson
- Chuck Asay
- Tony Auth
- Bruce Beattie
- Clay Bennett
- Lisa Benson
- Steve Benson
- Chip Bok
- Jim Borgman
- Steve Breen
- Chris Britt
- Stuart Carlson
- Ken Catalino
- Paul Conrad
- Jeff Danziger
- Matt Davies
- John Deering
- Bob Gorrell
- John Graziano
- Alex Hallatt
- Walt Handelsman
- David Horsey
- Clay Jones
- Kevin Kallaugher
- Steve Kelley
- Dick Locher
- Chan Lowe
- Mike Luckovich
- Gary Markstein
- Glenn McCoy
- Jim Morin
- Mike Shiell
- Jack Ohman
- Pat Oliphant
- Joel Pett
- Dwane Powell
- Ted Rall
- Michael Ramirez
- Marshall Ramsey
- Steve Sack
- Ben Sargent
- Drew Sheneman
- John Sherffius
- Scott Stantis
- Wayne Stayskal
- Dana Summers
- Paul Szep
- Mike Thompson
- Tom Toles
- Gary Varvel
- Kerry Waghorn
- Dan Wasserman
- Signe Wilkinson
- Don Wright
- Rob Rogers
- Ann Telnaes
