= List of comic strip syndicates =

This is a list of comic strip syndicates. Over the years, many syndicates have been acquired and otherwise absorbed by competitors; this list attempts to illustrate that.

== Comic strip syndicates ==
- Andrews McMeel Syndication (est. 2009) — formed by merger of Universal Press Syndicate and Uclick; formerly called Universal Uclick; includes GoComics
  - Uclick (1996–2009; merged with Universal Press Syndicate to form Universal Uclick) — formerly named Universal New Media
  - Universal Press Syndicate (1970–2009; merged with Uclick to form Universal Uclick) — former names include Universal New Media
    - Washington Star Syndicate (1965–1979)
      - George Matthew Adams Service (c. 1916–1965; acquired by The Washington Star Syndicate) — formerly known as the Adams Newspaper Service
    - Chronicle Features (1962–1998; acquired by Universal Press Syndicate in 1997)
    - Editors Press Service (1933–2010; acquired by Universal Press Syndicate in 2004 and renamed Atlantic Syndication)
  - United Media (1978–2011; formed from the consolidation of United Feature and Newspaper Enterprise Association; eventually acquired by Universal Uclick)
    - Newspaper Enterprise Association (c. 1909–1978; merged into United Media Enterprises)
    - United Feature Syndicate (1919–1978; merged into United Media Enterprises)
      - Metropolitan Newspaper Service (1919–1932; owned by the Bell Syndicate from 1920–1930; acquired an eventually absorbed by United Features)
      - Press Publishing Co. (c.1910–1931; acquired by E. W. Scripps Company)
      - World Feature Service (c. 1905–1931; acquired by E. W. Scripps Company)
      - Bell Syndicate (1916–1972; acquired by United Features) — known as the Bell-McClure Syndicate from 1930 to 1972
        - Associated Newspapers (1912–c. 1966; acquired by Bell Syndicate in 1930)
        - McClure Newspaper Syndicate (1884–1952; absorbed into Bell-McClure Syndicate) — began syndicating comic strips c. 1903
          - Wheeler Syndicate (1913–1916; acquired by McClure Syndicate) — syndicated the work of Bud Fisher and Fontaine Fox
- Creators Syndicate (est. 1987) — formed in reaction to King Features' acquisition of the Register and Tribune Syndicate and News America Syndicate
- King Features Syndicate (est. 1914)
  - Central Press Association (1910–1971; acquired and eventually absorbed by King Features) until ceasing operations in 1971)
    - North American Press Syndicate (?–1912; acquired by and absorbed into Central Press Association)
    - Editors Feature Service (?–1927; acquired by and absorbed into Central Press Association)
  - Register and Tribune Syndicate (1922–1986; acquired by Hearst / King Features),
  - Field Newspaper Syndicate (1941–1984; acquired by News Corporation and then King Features) — former names include the Chicago Sun Syndicate, the Field Enterprises Syndicate, and the Chicago Sun-Times Syndicate; later renamed News America Syndicate and then North America Syndicate
    - Chicago Times Syndicate (c. 1935-1948; acquired by Field Enterprises with the merger of the Chicago Sun and the Chicago Daily Times)
    - Publishers Syndicate (1925–1967; acquired by Field Enterprises) — became Publishers-Hall
    - Publishers-Hall Syndicate (1944–1975; merged into Field Newspaper Syndicate) — former names include Hall Syndicate, New York Post Syndicate, Post-Hall Syndicate, Inc., Hall Syndicate
      - New York Herald Tribune Syndicate (c. 1920–1966) — remaining strips taken over by Publishers-Hall
- Royal Comics Syndicate (Finland) (est. 2004)
- Torstar Syndication Services (Canada) (est. 1930) — King Features Syndicate's distribution partner in Canada; former names include Toronto Star Syndicate
- Tribune Content Agency (est. 1918) — former names include Tribune-New York (Daily) News Syndicate, Chicago Tribune Syndicate, the Chicago Tribune New York News Syndicate, Tribune Company Syndicate, and Tribune Media Services
  - Los Angeles Times Syndicate (c. 1949–2000; acquired by Tribune Media Services) — former names include Mirror Enterprises Syndicate and Los Angeles Times Mirror Syndicate
    - General Features Corp. (1937–1974; acquired by the Los Angeles Times Syndicate in 1967 and absorbed into its operations in 1974)
- The Washington Post Writers Group (est. 1973)

=== Defunct comic strip syndicates ===
- Al Smith Feature Service (1951–c. 1999) — mainly weekly strips
- AP Newsfeatures (1930–1961) — owned by the Associated Press
- Columbia Features (1953–1994)
- Comx Box Comics Syndicate (2014–2018) — distributed webcomics
- Frank Jay Markey Syndicate (c. 1936–c. 1950) — Markey was originally an executive at the McNaught Syndicate
- Lafave Newspaper Features (1931–1963)
- Ledger Syndicate (1915–c. 1950) — outlived its corporate owner, the Philadelphia Public Ledger
- Ledger Syndicate (1966–c. 1973) — second iteration of the syndicate
- McNaught Syndicate (1922–1989)
  - New York City Central Press Association (1920–1922; absorbed into McNaught Syndicate)
- National Newspaper Syndicate (1917–c. 1984) — formerly known as the John F. Dille Co.
  - Uncle Ray Syndicate (?–1922; acquired by National Newspaper Syndicate)

== See also ==
- Comic strip syndication
- List of newspaper comic strips
