= Wallace the Brave =

Comic strip by Will Henry

- Author(s): Will Henry
- Website: www.gocomics.com/wallace-the-brave
- Current status/schedule: Current daily strip
- Launch date: June 2015; 9 years ago
- Syndicate(s): Universal Uclick/Andrews McMeel Syndication
- Publisher(s): Andrews McMeel Publishing
- Genre(s): Humor, childhood, family life
- Preceded by: Ordinary Bill

Wallace the Brave is a humorous comic strip written and drawn by Will Henry and syndicated through Andrews McMeel Syndication. It debuted on the company's GoComics website in 2015. In March 2018 it began appearing in over 100 newspapers worldwide.

== Background ==
Will Henry, the pen name of liquor store co-owner William Henry Wilson, previously drew a strip called Dormmates for the Connecticut Daily Campus, the daily student newspaper at the University of Connecticut. After graduation he created the comic strip Ordinary Bill, which depicted a beach bum cartoonist and ran in his hometown newspaper The Jamestown Press, but found the subject matter too limiting.

Wallace the Brave is elaborated from sketches of a child Henry began to make after working on Ordinary Bill. He has claimed both Bill Watterson's Calvin and Hobbes and Richard Thompson's Cul de Sac as influences on the strip's style. The fictional setting of Snug Harbor incorporates elements of Henry's hometown of Jamestown, Rhode Island.

== Reception ==
A Wallace the Brave collection was published in paperback by Andrews McMeel Publishing in 2017. In April 2018, the collection was nominated for Eisner Awards as best humor publication and best publication for kids ages 9-12 categories.
