= What the Duck =

Comic strip

- Author: Aaron Johnson
- Website: whattheduck.net
- Current status/schedule: Weekly
- Launch date: July 2006
- End date: May 6, 2016
- Alternate name: W. T. Duck
- Syndicate(s): Universal Press Syndicate/Universal Uclick (2008–2016)
- Publisher: Andrews McMeel Publishing
- Genre(s): Humor, satire(?)

What the Duck is a comic strip by Aaron Johnson that was produced from 2006 to 2016. It started as a webcomic, with the first strip posted in July 2006. The strip is popular with photographers due to its accurate but humorously twisted take on the world of photography, and has been published in numerous photography magazines including Amateur Photographer. It was picked up for syndication in 2008 by Universal Press Syndicate under the name W. T. Duck.

== Background ==
The main character of the comic strip is a professional photographer who is a duck. The strip was launched in July 2006, and was originally intended as content filler for the website of Johnson's band, Sweet Jelly, rather than as a serious endeavor. Johnson originally published a series of only five strips; shortly thereafter, word of the new strip spread across the internet via photography-related message boards. What the Duck continued to grow in popularity, eventually spawning its own website as well as a line of WTD-themed merchandise.

== Overview ==
The comic strip's witty humor and smart observations about photography have made it a favorite among many amateur and professional photographers. However, Johnson said that What the Duck is not just about photographers, but about creative professionals in general: the strip provides a sometimes-unique perspective about their lives and experiences, and represents a "voice that isn’t always heard".

The name of each strip is chosen by the author from those suggested by the readers in the comment section of the comic. The author approves of and even encourages people spreading the strips on the web.

What the Duck has been described as having a "minimalist" style, utilizing "clean lines, crisp colors, and witty, wry dialogue". Because the characters are presented "as is", with little back story or character development, the humor in each strip is relatively easy to understand.

== Syndication ==
Johnson submitted What The Duck to six major comic strip syndicates in December 2006. Initially, he was turned down by Universal Press Syndicate (UPS). However, Johnson attracted their attention with "Syndicate Bingo", in which he placed the responses of the comic syndicates on a bingo board posted on his website.

UPS ultimately picked up What The Duck for syndication in 2008, but with the modified name, W.T. Duck. John Glynn, Vice President of Rights and Acquisitions for UPS, referred to Johnson as "the first real 21st century cartoonist".

The comic strip has been published in newspapers and magazines in the US, UK, Canada, South Africa, and Malaysia.

== Books ==
The comic strips have also been published in two books: What the Duck, Rule of Nerds, published by Lulu.com in 2007; and What the Duck: A W.T. Duck Collection, published by Andrews McMeel Publishing in 2009.

What the Duck merchandise is available through the official website.
