= Samuli Lintula =

Samuli Lintula (born 1971), known professionally under the penname Samson, is a Finnish cartoonist best known for the comic strip Dark Side of the Horse.

== Biography ==
Lintula grew up in Finland, reading comics such as Donald Duck, B.C., Peanuts, and Beetle Bailey. He attended college for two semesters and managed to sell cartoons to Finnish magazines during this time. In 1994, after dropping out of college, he began contributing to the Finnish cartoon magazine Myrkky which he continued until its discontinuation in 2008.

Since 1998, Lintula has been working to secure the distribution of comic book series. In 2008, he had the idea for Dark Side of the Horse, a comic which has been syndicated by Royal Comics Syndicate and appears on GoComics.

== Published works ==
- 2013: Year of the Horse: A Dark Side of the Horse Collection
