= Hector Cantú =

American writer

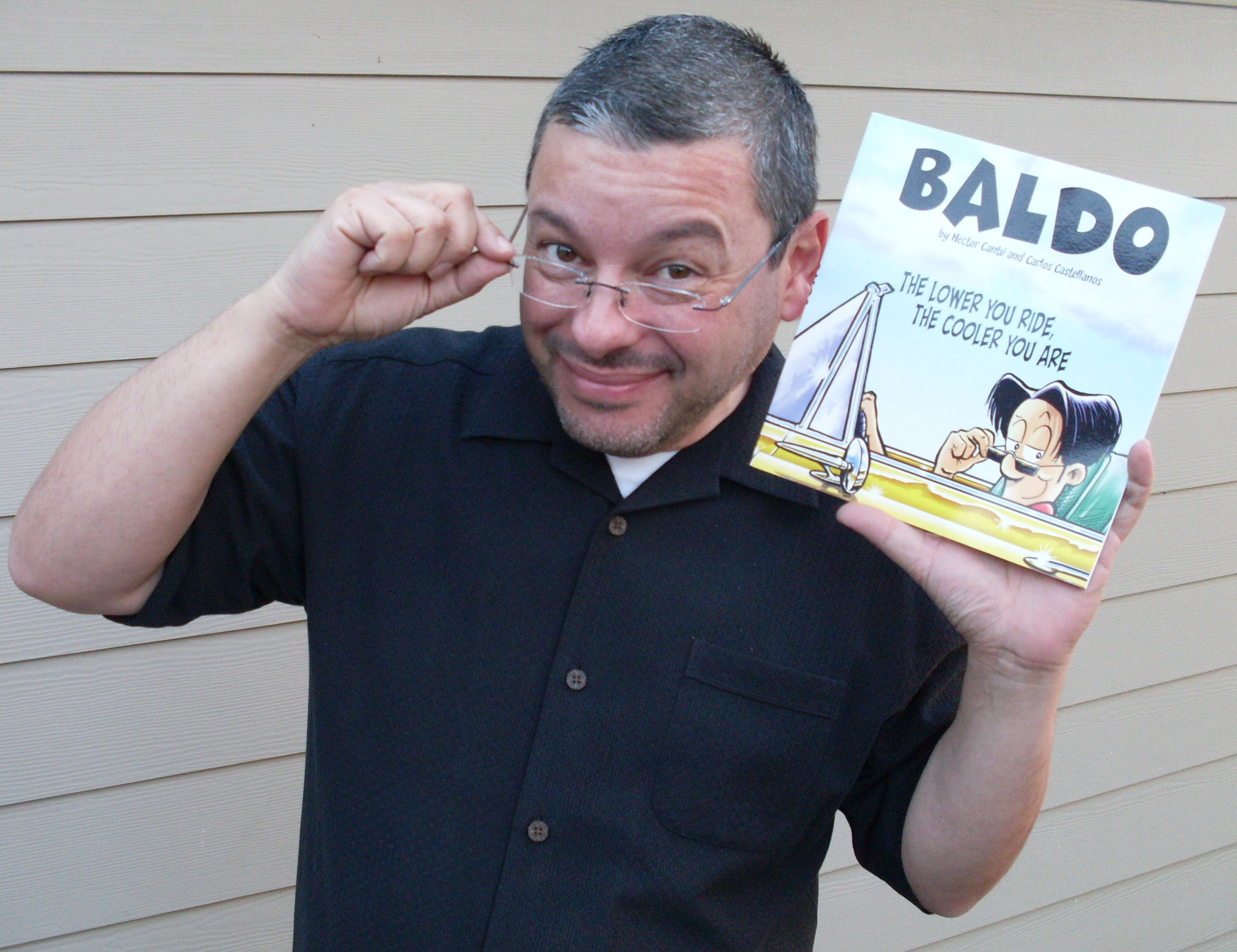
- Cantú in 2008
- Born: Hector David Cantú; September 16, 1961 (age 65) Weslaco, Texas, U.S.
- Area: Writer
- Notable works: Baldo

Hector David Cantú (born September 16, 1961) is an American writer, editor, and newspaper comic strip creator, best known for the Latino-American strip Baldo.

== Biography ==
=== Early life and career ===
Cantú created his first cartoon at age 12 for a community newspaper in Crystal City, Texas, owned by his brother, inspired by Mad magazine cartoonists Sergio Aragonés and Antonio Prohías. He attended Skyline High School in Dallas, where he was editor of the school newspaper. He studied journalism at the University of Texas at Austin, where he was an assistant managing editor at The Daily Texan. He later worked as a reporter and editor at the San Antonio Light, the Dallas Times Herald, and The Dallas Morning News. He was managing editor of Hispanic Business magazine in Santa Barbara, California. He has written freelance for the Los Angeles Times Magazine, The Hollywood Reporter, and D Magazine. Cantú is among the 21 Latino comic book and comic strip authors and artists featured in comic historian Frederick Luis Aldama's 2009 book Your Brain on Latino Comics.

=== Baldo ===
In 1998, Cantú and artist Carlos Castellanos teamed to create the comic strip Baldo, about a 15-year-old Latino-American teenager, Baldomero Bermudez, nickname Baldo, living with his 8-year-old sister Gracie; their father, Sergio; and their aunt, Tia Carmen. Universal Press Syndicate (now Andrews McMeel Syndication) contracted for the strip, and in April 2000 it launched in newspapers, which number nearly 200 as of late 2008. It ranked among Universal Press Syndicate's 5 most successful launches.

Cantú in 2007 said he and Castellanos were prompted to create Baldo

"because we were reading comics and looking for characters to identify with and who were like us, and we weren't seeing that on the comics pages. We saw cats, dogs, mice, etc. But not Latinos. Part of what makes America great is that everyone can have a voice, and newspapers recognize that. ... Lots of Baldo stories come from our lives growing up. A lot of stories simply reflect what we see everyday around us and in the newspaper. Why is the main character a teen? Dunno. Maybe that represents an ideal age for us. I think we both recall being 15 as a total laugh riot ... and not in a good way!"

Two Baldo compilation books, The Lower You Ride, The Cooler You Are and Night Of The Bilingual Telemarketers, have been published by Andrews McMeel Publishing, LLC.

The Spanish-language television network Univision optioned the strip for an animated television series.

=== Later career ===
As of 2007, Cantú is editor and publisher of The Intelligent Collector magazine at Heritage Auctions. He is co-editor of the book Collectible Movie Posters published by Whitman Publishing. He is founding chair of Texas Cartoonists, a regional chapter of the National Cartoonists Society.
