= Bill Amend =

American cartoonist

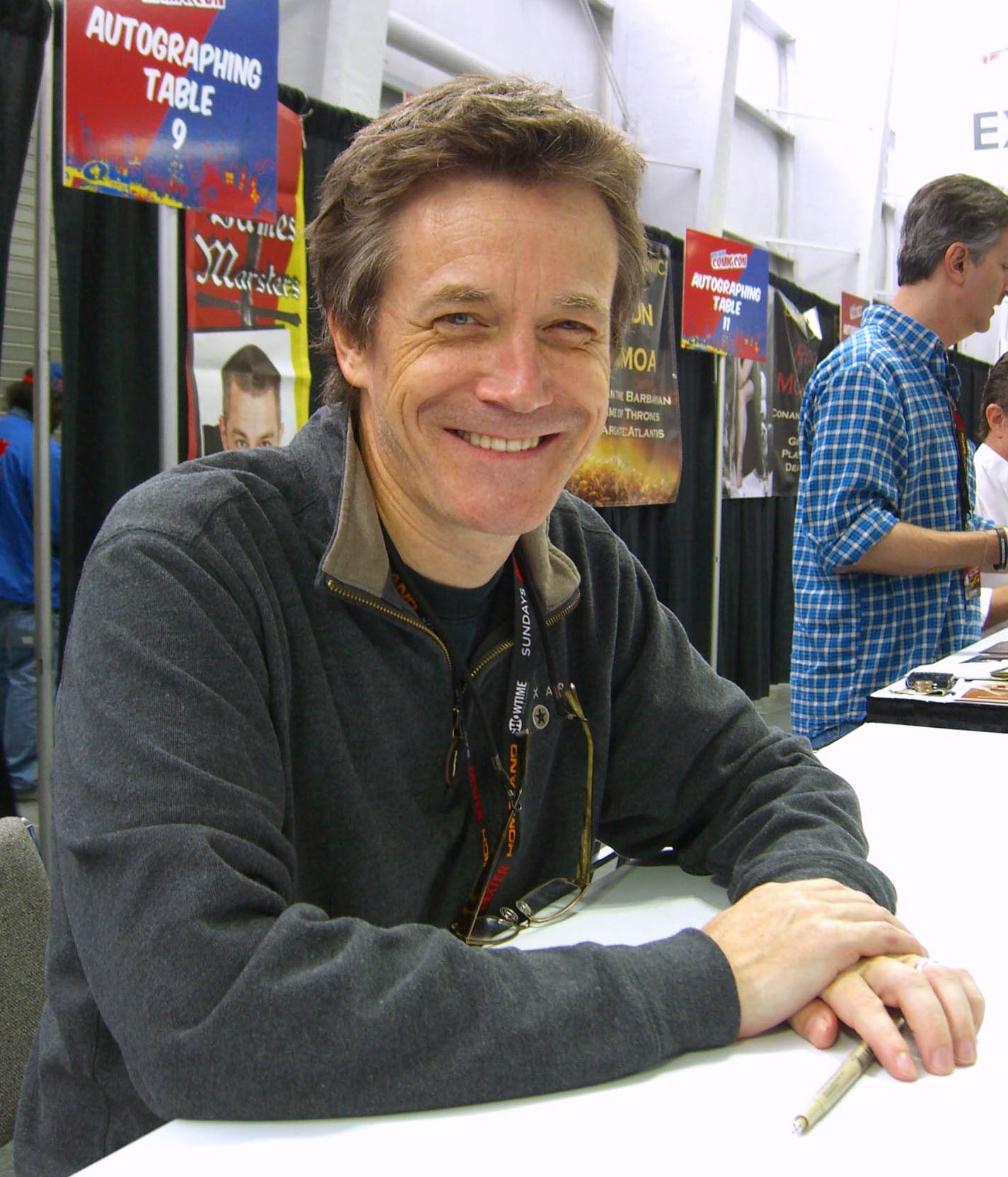
- Amend at the 2011 New York Comic Con
- Born: William J. C. Amend III; September 20, 1962 (age 63) Massachusetts, U.S.
- Awards: Reuben Award; Outstanding Cartoonist of the Year (2006); Inkpot Award (2012)

William J. C. Amend III (/ˈeɪmənd/; born September 20, 1962) is an American cartoonist. He is known for his comic strip FoxTrot.

== Early life ==
Amend was born in Massachusetts and raised in Northern California. He attended high school in Burlingame, California where he was a cartoonist on his school newspaper. Amend is an Eagle Scout in the Boy Scouts of America. He graduated with a degree in physics from Amherst College in 1984.

== Career ==
After about a month in the animation business, Amend got fired for being unqualified and decided to pursue a cartooning career and got signed on with Universal Press Syndicate after three years of trying. FoxTrot first appeared on April 10, 1988. On May 21, 1999, Amherst College awarded him an honorary degree as Doctor of Humane Letters.

On December 5, 2006, Universal Press Syndicate issued a press release stating that his strip, FoxTrot, would turn into a Sunday-only strip. Amend stated that he wanted to continue doing the strip, but at a less hurried pace. This news was followed by several weeks of the characters discussing a "cartoonist" semi-retiring to Sundays only, and what methods he would use to phase out the daily strips. The last daily FoxTrot cartoon was printed on December 30, 2006. Amend also sometimes did guest strips for webcomics such as Scott Kurtz's PvP, Mike Krahulik and Jerry Holkins's Penny Arcade, and Randall Munroe's XKCD.

On May 26, 2007, Amend was presented with the Reuben Award for Outstanding Cartoonist of the Year.

== Personal life ==
Amend made a television appearance on The Screen Savers, which aired October 20, 2003, on the former TechTV. Amend was also an avid World of Warcraft player who played on the server "Bronzebeard".
