= The Fusco Brothers =

American comic strip by J. C. Duffy

- Author(s): J. C. Duffy
- Website: www.gocomics.com/thefuscobrothers
- Current status/schedule: Current daily gag-a-day strip
- Launch date: 1989; 36 years ago
- Syndicate(s): Universal Press Syndicate/Universal Uclick/Andrews McMeel Syndication
- Publisher(s): Andrews McMeel Publishing
- Genre(s): Humor, family

The Fusco Brothers is an American gag-a-day comic strip created by J. C. Duffy which features the four Fusco bachelors — Rölf, Lance, Al, and Lars — along with Lance's girlfriend, Gloria, and Axel, the Fuscos' wolverine. The strip has been nationally syndicated since 1989.

== Collections ==
- "Come Here Often?" Bad Pickup Lines and Other Dating Atrocities from the Fusco Brothers (Paperback - Jan 2000 - ASIN B0025UMWU4)
- Virtual Banality: A Fusco Brothers Collection (Paperback - Aug 1996 - ISBN 0-8362-2121-4)
- Cruel and Unusual: A Fusco Brothers Collection (Paperback - Sep 1995 - ISBN 0-8362-0421-2)
- Newark and Reality...Together Again: A Harsh Dose of The Fusco Brothers (Paperback - Sep 1992)
- Meet the Fusco Brothers (Paperback - Oct 1990)
