= Chip Dunham =

American cartoonist

Robert John "Chip" Dunham (b. La Crosse, Wisconsin) is a cartoonist best known as the creator of the comic strip Overboard, which debuted in 1990.

The strip - which tells the comical tale of a group of pirates - is distributed through Universal Press Syndicate. In 1993, the National Cartoonist Society nominated Overboard for Best Comic Strip.

Chip attended Crestwood High School in Dearborn Heights, Michigan, graduating in 1971. In high school, he was known for his writing talent.

In 1980, he received a journalism degree from the University of Wisconsin–Madison; he lives in Beverly Hills, Michigan.
