= Matt Eicheldinger =

American author, teacher and media personality

- Born: Matthew Eicheldinger; 1987 (age 38–39); Colorado, United States
- Education: Concordia University, St. Paul (2009)
- Occupations: Author, former educator, social media personality
- Years active: 2009–present
- Children: 2
- Website: matteicheldinger.com

Matt Eicheldinger (born c. 1987) is an American author, former middle school teacher, and social media personality. He is best known for his Matt Sprouts series of middle-grade novels and his memoir Sticky Notes: Memorable Lessons from Ordinary Moments. His debut novel became a The New York Times and USA Today bestseller in its first week of publication.

== Early life and education ==
Eicheldinger grew up on Colorado's western slope, where he developed interests in soccer and reading comics. He attended Concordia University in St. Paul on a track scholarship, graduating in 2009. During his college years, he was an eight-time NSIC Champion in men's track and field. In 2024, he was inducted into the Concordia-St. Paul Athletic Hall of Fame.

== Teaching career ==
After completing his student teaching in Fridley, Minnesota, Eicheldinger began his teaching career in the Wayzata school district, where he taught middle school language arts for over 15 years.

== Writing career ==
=== Early attempts and rejection ===
Eicheldinger wrote his first manuscript, Matt Sprouts and the Curse of the Ten Broken Toes, at age 22 in 2010, completing it in under 30 days. The book was originally created as a teaching tool to help him connect with his students by sharing relatable childhood stories.

For the next 15 years, Eicheldinger faced repeated rejection from publishers, receiving over 200 rejection letters from literary agents and publishers. During this period, he continued to refine the manuscript while using the stories in his classroom.

=== Self-publishing success ===
In 2021, during the COVID-19 pandemic, Eicheldinger decided to self-publish through Wise Ink Creative Publishing in Minneapolis. He launched a Kickstarter campaign that was fully funded within 24 hours. The independently published version of Matt Sprouts and the Curse of the Ten Broken Toes went on to win four national awards, including Indie Book of the Year.

=== Traditional publishing breakthrough ===
The success of his self-published work caught the attention of Andrews McMeel Publishing, known for publishing Calvin and Hobbes, Big Nate, and Peanuts. In 2024, Andrews McMeel republished Matt Sprouts and the Curse of the Ten Broken Toes, which became a New York Times and USA Today bestseller in its first week of publication.

== Social media presence ==
Eicheldinger posts on social media platforms, particularly Instagram and TikTok, where he shares educational content and storytelling. His videos have accumulated over 100 million views across platforms, making him one of the most followed teacher accounts on Instagram with more than 390,000 followers. His viral content has directly contributed to book sales, with one viral video reportedly selling 600 copies in a single weekend.

== Writing style and themes ==
Eicheldinger's work is characterized by humor, relatable characters, and meaningful life lessons drawn from both his childhood experiences and teaching career. His books are specifically designed for reluctant readers, featuring fast-moving plots and accessible language. The Matt Sprouts series is semi-autobiographical, drawing from Eicheldinger's own childhood experiences growing up as what he describes as "the fastest kid on Colorado's western slope."

== Reception and impact ==
His books have been successful with reluctant readers and have gained recognition for bridging entertainment with educational value. He has had speaking engagements at schools and educational conferences across the United States.

== Personal life ==
Eicheldinger lives in Bloomington, Minnesota with his wife and two children.

== Works ==
=== Matt Sprouts series ===
- Matt Sprouts and the Curse of the Ten Broken Toes (2021, self-published; 2024, Andrews McMeel Publishing)
- Matt Sprouts and the Day Nora Ate the Sun (2024, Andrews McMeel Publishing)
- Matt Sprouts and The Search for the Chompy Wompers (2025, Andrews McMeel Publishing)

=== Children's poetry ===
- Holes in My Underwear: Over 100 Poems That Will Knock Your Socks Off (2025, Andrews McMeel Publishing)

=== Adult non-fiction ===
- Sticky Notes: Memorable Lessons from Ordinary Moments (2024, Andrews McMeel Publishing)

=== When the Rain Came series ===
- When the Rain Came (2026, Andrews McMeel Publishing)
- When the Sun Returned (2026, Andrews McMeel Publishing)

== See also ==
- Middle grade fiction
- Children's literature
- Andrews McMeel Publishing
