= Matt Sprouts =

Book series

- Matt Sprouts and the Curse of the Ten Broken Toes (2021); Matt Sprouts and the Day Nora Ate the Sun (2024); Matt Sprouts and The Search for the Chompy Wompers (2025)
- Author: Matt Eicheldinger
- Illustrator: Matt Eicheldinger
- Cover artist: Matt Eicheldinger
- Country: United States
- Language: English
- Genre: Middle grade fiction, Children's literature, Humor
- Publisher: Andrews McMeel Publishing (current); Wise Ink Creative Publishing (original)
- Published: 2021–present
- Media type: Print (Hardcover, Paperback), E-book, Audiobook

Matt Sprouts is a series of middle grade fiction books written and illustrated by American author Matt Eicheldinger. The series follows the adventures of eleven-year-old Matt Sprouts as he navigates the challenges of middle school life. The first book in the series became a New York Times and USA Today in 2024.

== Protagonist ==
The series centers on Matt Sprouts, an eleven-year-old boy described by the author as "relatable but imperfect", who faces various challenges and adventures while learning important life lessons. The character is semi-autobiographical, based on Eicheldinger's own childhood experiences growing up on Colorado's western slope.

== Books ==
=== Matt Sprouts and the Curse of the Ten Broken Toes (2021/2024) ===
The debut novel follows Matt Sprouts after he accidentally injures his neighbor Jenna with a martial arts move, leading him to believe he has been afflicted with "the Curse," a local myth that ruins middle schoolers' lives. Throughout the story, Matt experiences character growth, makes new friends, develops work ethic, and indeed breaks all ten of his toes.

=== Matt Sprouts and the Day Nora Ate the Sun (2024) ===
The second book in the series, published in September 2024, features Matt's encounter with Nora the goat, described as a babysitting challenge unlike any other.

=== Matt Sprouts and The Search for the Chompy Wompers (2025) ===
The third book in the series, published in June 2025, follows Matt and his friends as they attempt to collect a new toy.

== Development and publication ==
The series originated from Eicheldinger's teaching practice of sharing childhood stories with his students to build rapport. He maintained a storytelling jar in his classroom filled with slips of paper containing titles of stories from his childhood, which became the foundation for the Matt Sprouts character and adventures. He described the intended audience for the book as "reluctant or struggling readers" who would be kept engaged with a lighthearted and fast-moving plot.

Eicheldinger both writes and illustrates the series, despite having no formal art training. His illustration style developed from years of drawing his students as cartoon characters for end-of-year coloring sheets. He has been drawing the Matt Sprouts character since third grade. Eicheldinger deliberately chose not to illustrate certain characters, such as "The Purple Grape Lady," to allow readers to use their imagination.

The first book was originally self-published in September 2021 through Wise Ink Creative Publishing. Andrews McMeel Publishing acquired the rights and republished it in March 2024.

== Reception ==
The first book won four national awards, including Indie Book of the Year, when first self-published in 2021. It was a New York Times and USA Today bestseller upon its traditional publication in 2024.

== Themes ==
The Matt Sprouts series explores themes common to middle-grade literature, including personal responsibility and consequence; friendship and social relationships; resilience and perseverance; self-discovery and character growth; and the balance between individual agency and external circumstances. The books address the "illogical urgency of preadolescence" and the emotional swings between elation and devastation typical of middle school experiences.
