= How Comics Are Made =

2025 nonfiction book by Glenn Fleishman

- Cover of first trade edition (2025)
- Author: Glenn Fleishman
- Language: English
- Subject: History of newspaper comics; printing
- Genre: Nonfiction
- Published: June 3, 2025
- Publisher: Andrews McMeel Publishing
- Media type: Print (hardcover)
- ISBN: 9781524898779

How Comics Are Made: A Visual History from the Drawing Board to the Printed Page is a 2025 nonfiction book by the American author and journalist Glenn Fleishman. It traces the history of newspaper comic strips from the 1890s to the present through the technical processes by which they were drawn, reproduced, and printed. Published by Andrews McMeel Publishing with a foreword by the novelist Michael Chabon, it was nominated for a 2026 Eisner Award for Best Comics-Related Book.

== Background and publication ==
Fleishman, who specializes in the history of type and printing, crowdfunded the book through Kickstarter in 2024 and self-published it that year under the title How Comics Were Made. Its rights were subsequently acquired by Andrews McMeel Publishing, which issued a trade edition on June 3, 2025, retitled How Comics Are Made. The book was designed by the cartoonist and illustrator Mark Kaufman, and includes a foreword by Michael Chabon.

== Content ==
The book is organized chronologically by shifts in production technology, from the era of the Yellow Kid in the 1890s through the rise of webcomics. Rather than approaching comics primarily as an art form, it treats the strip as an industrially manufactured object, describing processes such as metal engraving, relief printing and offset printing, halftone and color separation, and digital production. The text draws on archival artifacts and interviews with cartoonists, historians, and production workers.

== Reception ==
The book was nominated for the 2026 Eisner Award for Best Comics-Related Book. The Comics Journal included it among the best comics of 2025, describing it as an informative and entertaining account of the medium's technical mechanics.

In a full-length review for SOLRAD, the critic Tom Shapira highlighted the book's attention to the largely overlooked role of engravers and other production workers in comics history, while describing its prose as functional rather than stylish. The Comics Beat examined the book's treatment of color reproduction and printing in a 2026 criticism column, characterizing it as a technical work whose details open onto broader cultural observations.
