= Jan Eliot =

American cartoonist (born 1950)

Jan Eliot (born 1950 in San Jose, California) is an American cartoonist.

== Life and career ==
Before becoming a full-time cartoonist, Jan worked as a waitress, car salesperson, bookmobile driver, advertising copywriter, graphic designer, and greeting card writer. In her cartoonist career, she initially worked as a graphic designer in the daytime, while doing cartoons at night. Some independent papers published her work, and after 16 years, she achieved syndication, and became a full-time cartoonist. Prior to Eliot's syndication, she was mentored by cartoonist Lynn Johnston, who proofed the cartoon strips.

She chose the name Eliot after her divorce, in honor of George Eliot. She lives in Eugene, Oregon and is married to Ted Lay.

== Cartoons ==
Eliot wrote and illustrated the comic strip Stone Soup. She created a previous strip known as Patience and Sarah, which enjoyed a run of five years in 10 publications.

Her next comic strip was called Sister City. This weekly strip appeared in the Eugene, Oregon, The Register-Guard for five years before the name was changed to Stone Soup in November 1995, when it became nationally syndicated by Universal Press Syndicate/Universal Uclick. Stone Soup is syndicated to more than 300 newspapers, mostly in America but also across the world.

The strip's characters, widowed single mom Val and her children Alix and Holly, were based on Eliot's life and the lives of those around her, but she also considers each character a reflection of herself. Val's sister, Joan is also a working mom, who lives across the fence from her. Other characters include Joan's husband, Wally and Val's new husband, Phil.

Stone Soup featured as a daily strip for 20 years until October 2015, when Eliot decided she no longer wanted to draw a daily comic, to devote more time to travel, socialize and focus on other creative projects. She continued to create a Sunday cartoon strip.

After reader outcry at the family-oriented strip's cessation in the Montreal Gazette, the weekend version of Stone Soup was reintroduced to the Montreal Gazette in January 2016.

On June 15, 2020, she announced that she was retiring. The last Stone Soup strip was published on July 26, 2020.

== Books ==
In addition to eleven Stone Soup compilations, Eliot's work has appeared in:

- Women's Glibber: State-of-the-Art Women's Humor, edited by Roz Warren. (1992) ISBN 0-89594-548-7
- Mothers! Cartoons by Women, edited by Roz Warren. (1993) ISBN 0-89594-611-4
- What Is This Thing Called Sex? Cartoons by Women, edited by Roz Warren. (1993) ISBN 0-89594-631-9
- Off Road Parenting: Practical Solutions for Difficult Behavior, by Caesar Pacifici, Patricia Chamberlain, Lee White, and Jan Eliot. (2002) ISBN 1-892194-25-2

== Group exhibitions ==
2011 Timely and Timeless, Library of Congress (September 2011)

2016 Comic City, USA, Oregon Historical Society (December 2016 - January 2017)

== Awards ==
2010 Eugene Arts and Letters award
