= Cornered =

Cornered may refer to:

- Cornered (1924 film), a 1924 silent film
- Cornered (1932 film), a 1932 Pre Code western film
- Cornered (1945 film), a 1945 film noir starring Dick Powell
- Cornered! (film), a 2010 horror film starring Steve Guttenberg
- Cornered (comics), a comic strip
- "Cornered" (Breaking Bad), a season four episode of Breaking Bad
- "Cornered" (Star Wars: The Bad Batch)
