= Close to Home (comic strip) =

American comic strip

- Author: John McPherson
- Website: www.gocomics.com/closetohome
- Current status/schedule: Current daily gag panel
- Launch date: December 1992; 32 years ago
- Syndicate(s): Universal Press Syndicate/Andrews McMeel Syndication
- Publisher: Andrews McMeel Publishing
- Genre: Humor

Close to Home is a daily, one-panel comic strip by American cartoonist John McPherson that debuted in 1992. The comic strip features no ongoing plot, but is instead a collection of one-shot jokes covering a number of subjects that are "close to home", such as marriage, children, school, work, sports, health and home life. It achieved its greatest peak in popularity in the mid-to-late 1990s, when several newspapers picked up the strip to replace the retired The Far Side. As of 2021, it runs in nearly 700 newspapers worldwide.

== Controversy ==
A Close to Home strip published on February 21, 2020, depicting the Lone Ranger and Tonto in a bar, was deemed offensive and racist, leading some newspaper publishers to cancel the comic and others to apologize to readers.
