= J. C. Duffy =

- Born: United States
- Areas: Cartoonist, illustrator, writer
- Notable works: The Fusco Brothers

J.C. Duffy is an American cartoonist. He currently creates The Fusco Brothers which has been syndicated since 1989. He created the comics "Go Figure", "Go Fish" (2002 to 2007) and "Lug Nuts." He also writes and draws cartoons that appear in The New Yorker, Narrative Magazine and other publications.

He has authored several books, including Moot Points: Deranged Drawings Paperback – January 1, 1981,Newark and Reality...Together Again: A Harsh Dose of the Fusco Brothers Paperback – September 1, 1992, and Come Here Often? Bad Pickup Lines from the Fusco Brothers Paperback - December 5, 2007.
