= Editors Press Service =

Former American print syndication service

- Formerly: Atlantic Syndication (2004–2010)
- Industry: Print syndication
- Founded: 1933
- Founder: Joshua B. Powers
- Defunct: 2010; 16 years ago
- Fate: Merged with Universal Press Syndicate as part of Universal Uclick
- Headquarters: New York City, New York, U.S.
- Area served: United States
- Products: Comic strips, newspaper columns, editorial cartoons
- Owner: The Evening Post Publishing Company (1933–2004); Universal Press Syndicate (2004–2010)

Editors Press Service (EPS; later known as Atlantic Syndication) was an American print syndication service of columns and comic strips that was in operation from 1933 to 2010. It was notable for being the first U.S. company to actively syndicate material internationally. Despite surviving for more than seven decades, EPS was never a large operation, characterized by comic strip historian Allan Holtz as a "hole-in-the-wall outfit."

During the Cold War, Editors Press Service was reportedly used as a channel for covert propaganda produced by or on behalf of the Central Intelligence Agency (CIA), particularly for distribution in Latin America. A 1977 investigation by The New York Times, citing former CIA officials and other sources familiar with the operation, reported that the service distributed articles prepared by or for the agency. EPS founder Joshua B. Powers also had connections to figures and organizations associated with CIA activities in the Western Hemisphere.

== History ==
Editors Press Service was founded in 1933 by Joshua B. Powers in partnership with The Evening Post Publishing Company, to provide Latin American newspapers with comics strips, cooking features, and other material, in exchange for ad space that Powers would in turn sell to U.S. companies. Powers was reportedly a former U.S. government agent whose beat was South America.

Chilean political figure Carlos Dávila was associated with EPS from its foundation in 1933. Sebastian Tomas Robles, son of Peruvian composer and ethnomusicologist Daniel Alomía Robles, was a staff cartoonist for EPS beginning in 1933.

Cartoonist Mort Leav began his professional career in 1936 with EPS, supplying illustrations in the period 1937 to 1940 for articles syndicated to South American newspapers.

From 1936 to 1940, Editors Press published the weekly comic book Wags in the U.K. (partnering with T. V. Boardman) and Australia. Wags #1 (Jan. 1937) is notable for featuring the debut of Sheena, Queen of the Jungle. She was created by Jerry Iger, who ran his own small studio, Universal Phoenix Features (UFP), and who commissioned Mort Meskin to produce prototype drawings of Sheena.

Comic strips syndicated by EPS at various points in the 1940s included Captain Wings, Doctor X, and Olly of the Movies.

After a long hiatus which last from the 1950s through most of the 1980s, Editors Press got back into comic strip syndication in the 1980s and '90s. Starting in 1989 they began syndicating a Tom and Jerry strip, produced mostly by Kelley Jarvis, which ran until 1994. At that point the company picked up The Flintstones by Karen Machette, which it inherited from the McNaught Syndicate. Editors Press syndicated The Flintstones until 1998.

In 2004, the Evening Post Publishing Company sold Editors Press Service to the Universal Press Syndicate (UPS), which renamed it Atlantic Syndication.

In 2010, Atlantic was merged with UPS as part of Universal Uclick. International syndication continued with representation of The Christian Science Monitor News Service, GlobalPost, London's The Independent news service, and a fashion and celebrity news service called The Daily.

== Comic strips and panels ==
=== Editors Press ===
==== 1940s ====
- Captain Wings by "Flowers" (1946–1947)
- Doctor X by M. R. Mont (1946–1947)
- Olly of the Movies by Julian Ollendorff (c. 1938 – c. February 1946) — inherited from Consolidated News Features, which had inherited it from the McNaught Syndicate, where it had debuted January 22, 1934

==== 1980s and 1990s ====
- The Flintstones by Karen Machette (c. 1994–1998) — inherited from the McNaught Syndicate, where it originated October 2, 1961
- Tom and Jerry (1989–1994) by Kelley Jarvis (1989–1990, 1991–1994) and Paul Kupperberg & Rich Maurizio (1990–1991)

=== Atlantic Syndication/Universal Uclick ===
- Aaggghhh by Ham (2017–present)
- Condorito by René Pepo Ríos (c. 2004-c. 2010) — inherited from Universal Press Syndicate, which had acquired it from United Feature Syndicate in 1993
- Gaturro by NIK (2004–present)
- Ginger Meggs currently by Jason Chatfield (2004–present)
- Ronaldinho Gaucho by Mauricio de Sousa (2006–c. 2011)
- Tutelandia by Tute (2004–present)

== Editors Press comic books ==
- Wags [Australia] (204 issues, 1936–1940)
- Wags [UK] (88 issues, 1 January 1937–4 November 1938)
