= Baldo (Hector Cantú comic strip) =

American comic strip

- Author(s): Hector Cantú
- Illustrator(s): Carlos Castellanos
- Website: www.gocomics.com/baldo
- Current status/schedule: Running
- Launch date: April 17, 2000; 25 years ago
- Syndicate(s): Universal Press Syndicate/Universal Uclick/Andrews McMeel Syndication
- Publisher(s): Andrews McMeel Publishing
- Genre(s): Humor, family

Baldo is an American comic strip written by Hector Cantú and illustrated by Carlos Castellanos. It was launched on April 17, 2000.

== Characters ==
=== Primary ===
- Baldomero "Baldo" Bermudez is the titular character. A Latino teenager, his primary interests are cars and girls. He is also obsessed with being cool, and is in the middle of an ongoing process to build his own lowrider out of a 1964 Chevrolet Impala. He has a job at Auto Y Rod, an auto supply shop (whose logo resembles that of Mercedes-Benz), and according to comic strips in January 2007 and August 2011, he is 15 years old.
- Graciela "Gracie" Bermudez is Baldo's annoying younger sister. She is an ardent admirer of Frida Kahlo and frequently attempts to be an activist. She is remarkably intelligent and enjoys reading, although she is a constant annoyance to her older brother. In a May 2009 strip that quotes from the Wikipedia article, Gracie declared that she wrote that article for Wikipedia in Cinco de Mayo.
- Sergio "Papi" Bermudez, a widower, is the patriarch of the family, the father of Baldo and Gracie, and the owner of a small business. He is often seen by his children as being dorky, although they love him all the same.
- Tia Carmen (nee Delgado) is Baldo and Gracie's ditzy great-aunt. An older woman and very devout in her religious beliefs (she has over 200 religious figurines), Carmen has a vast knowledge and love of ancient world customs, foods, and herbal remedies. An April Fools' Day gag strip in 2007 depicted her as being detained by the Department of Homeland Security, and a two-week series around the same time drawn in a photo-realistic style told of her as coming to live with the Bermudezes after Sergio's wife Rosa was killed in a drunk driving crash (see below).
- Cruz is Baldo's best friend. In 2017, it was explained that Cruz is a "dreamer," an immigrant brought to the United States as a child. Arguably similar to Hector from Zits, Cruz is often seen accompanying Baldo in the quest for coolness.

=== Secondary ===
- Nora is Gracie's Afro-Cuban best friend and confidant. She is as bright and intelligent as Gracie.
- Beatriz is a young woman, formerly a co-worker at Auto Y Rod. She made a first appearance on the March 5th, 2007. Baldo liked her on a first sight, but later in the strip she told him that she has a boyfriend, although she has since broken up with him. Her appearances have become more common. On the June 17th, 2010 comic, it is revealed that her last name is Ortiz. In the strip published on Friday, August 1, 2014, she was laid off from her job.
- Rayna is Cruz's girlfriend. She has a congenitally compromised immune system and can't leave her home, attending classes and dates by means of a telepresence robot.
- Ralphie is a friend of Baldo's who owns a low rider with an advanced sound system. He infrequently appears in the strip.
- El Cucuy is the Bermudez family's boogeyman, and is somewhat akin to the snorklewacker from Bloom County. He was forced into retirement after Baldo and Gracie stopped fearing him.
- Joey was a semi-recurring white teenager and one of Baldo's former co-workers at Auto Y Rod. He had a poor work ethic and ignorance of the Spanish language and Latino culture. In most of his appearances, Joey's seen casually leaning against boxes while Baldo's actively working, sipping a coffee drink, continually talking about his efforts to avoid any degree of responsibility. Even with his bad work ethic, Joey was promoted to assistant manager, which frustrated Baldo even more. Joey's poor work ethic continues, to where he immediately hangs up on customers, causing business to flounder. Finally realizing his mistake, Mr. Rod fires Joey and names Baldo the new assistant manager in his place.
- Estella Dank is Baldo's current girlfriend. She first appeared on August 23, 2011.
- Britney Denise "Smiley" Rogers is Baldo's white ex-girlfriend. She was originally introduced in 2001 as Baldo's new next door neighbor, somewhat plain and tomboyish, with an interest in Latino culture, and was Baldo's girlfriend from 2003 to 2006. Shortly after the breakup, Smiley underwent a sudden makeover, joined a popular girls' clique, and started going by her middle name.
- Sylvia Sanchez was considered the "prettiest girl in school" by Baldo, and the object of his eye from the earlier strips. She removed from the strip in 2003, shortly before Baldo and Smiley began dating.
- Billy is an antagonistic, subtly bigoted white teen who spoke his prejudice against Latinos by accusing them of discriminating against him. Consequently, he is disturbed by the emergence of Latino oriented businesses. He is generally a caricature of those who express their bigotry with arguments of reverse discrimination. During a march for immigration rights, he is seen as a counter-demonstrator telling a reporter about the dangers of illegal immigrants.
- Che is a Latino teen who is occasionally acquainted with Baldo, his family and friends. Much like the Cuban revolutionary leader he is named after, Che harbors adamant beliefs on Marxism and socialism. He is strictly opposed to anything that he feels is demeaning toward the Latino community, including working at a paying job (even if it's a Latino oriented business). Because of his beliefs, Che tends to be a nuisance to Baldo and others.
- Smiley's brother is the Rogers equivalent of Gracie. For a brief time, he was Gracie's "boyfriend", but that relationship has since been dissolved.
- Mr. Harold was the Gang Activity Monitor at Baldo's school. He had a "tough guy" image, and falsely accused Baldo of being in a gang after mistaking a game of Paper Rock Scissors for gang signals.
- Rosa Bermudez was Baldo and Gracie's mother, and Sergio's wife. Though she has never been seen or heard in the strip (except that her face has been shown in the form of a framed photo), it has been revealed that she had died in a car crash when Baldo was 10 years old. The April 3, 2007 strip—part of a sequence atypically drawn in a realistic style—stated that a car driven by an inebriated motorist collided with Rosa's minivan when she drove Baldo and Gracie from a soccer game. The collision killed Rosa instantly and bruised Gracie. Baldo's soccer ball apparently saved his life in the crash. The strip has since been rerun several times. The April 4, 2007 strip shows Rosa's face, drawn realistically, in a framed photo; other strips (including May 17 & 18, 2002 and September 28, 2003) show her, again in photos, in cartoon form. She was shown in full form in a flashback on Sunday, May 15, 2022 and depicted in Baldo's sketchbook recounting memories of their relationship in the May 14, 2023 Mother's Day strip.
- Gregorio who was introduced on the March 26, 2007 comic, is the one who Tia Carmen has been talking to about Rosa's crash and why she had come to live with Baldo and Family. They met at the tomato section of a store.
- Roberto is Tia Carmen's departed husband. Sometimes his spirit visits Tia (in her imagination) for a short time.
- Rozco is a homeless man who's uses a wheelchair and has a pet chihuahua. He stays around Auto Y Rod's back lot.
- Jake is a co-worker of Baldo's who spends most of his workday actively trying to avoid doing any real work, usually by continually engaging in conversations with Mr. Rod or coming up with new excuses on why he can't work.

== Themes ==
Although primarily a strip focused merely on light humor, Baldo has at times delved into political and social subjects relevant to the Latino community, such as lottery scams, the 2006 United States immigration reform protests, and greater involvement in improving one's community. Baldo also allows guest artists during Hispanic Heritage Month; these guests generally depict Latinos crude stereotypes, often go on about on low rider cars and women in very revealing clothing. This has resulted in both praise and criticism from readers, whose letters have been posted on Baldo's official website and then answered (sometimes sarcastically) by the strip's creators.

In 2009, the strip also dealt with Sergio developing diabetes. Gracie especially reminded Sergio of the need for proper diet and exercise to control his illness, but little mention has been made of Sergio's diabetes after the initial run of strips.

Starting in 2020, the strip dealt with the effects of the COVID-19 pandemic on the family.

== Cartoon collections ==
As of 2008, two collections of the strip have been published in book form.

- The Lower You Ride, The Cooler You Are (2001)
- Night of the Bilingual Telemarketers (2002)
