= Don Asmussen =

American cartoonist (1962–2021)

- Self portrait from Bad Reporter comic strip
- Born: October 31, 1962; Rhode Island
- Died: December 9, 2021 (aged 59); San Francisco, California
- Occupation: Editorial cartoonist
- Employer: San Francisco Chronicle
- Website: www.sfchronicle.com/bad_reporter/

Donald Asmussen (October 31, 1962 – December 9, 2021) was an American cartoonist working for the San Francisco Chronicle and Universal Press Syndicate.

== Career ==
Asmussen was born in Rhode Island. Early in his career, he published collages and celebrity caricatures in The New Yorker and drew a comic strip for Time called The Drawing Board; he worked on animations for his webseries "Like, News" which aired on Mondo Media throughout 1999-2001 and on the 2001 film Monkeybone. In newspapers, he worked at the Portland Press Herald, The Detroit News, and The San Diego Union-Tribune before becoming a staff artist at the San Francisco Examiner in 1995; following its merger with the San Francisco Chronicle in 2000, he worked for the Chronicle for the remainder of his career.

At the Examiner, Asmussen started his first weekly comic strip, San Francisco Comic Strip. He later drew Super Average Joe and short comic strip serials for events he covered on location, including Republican Convention Comic Strip and strips on the Super Bowl, the World Series, and the Burning Man festival. His strip The Hero Santon appeared in Salon and in Mad magazine. A strip by him ran in Time from 1998 to 2001.

His most recognized strip, the semi-weekly Bad Reporter, began in the San Francisco Chronicle in 2003 and ran under the slogan "The lies behind the truth, and the truth behind those lies that are behind that truth." The strip was syndicated by Universal Press Syndicate. It was on hiatus from 2018 to 2019 during Asmussen's cancer treatment and last updated in March 2021.

=== Books ===
In 1997, Asmussen published a collection of his comic strips, The San Francisco Comic Strip Book of Big-Ass Mocha.

In 2006, he published Dog vs. Cat: A Nation Divided, a satire of the 2004 presidential election.

In 2019, Asmussen collaborated with blogger Mary Ladd on The Wig Diaries, a collection of humorous essays about cancer by Ladd with illustrations by Asmussen.

== Personal life and death ==
Asmussen was married to Kelly Zito, a former reporter for the San Francisco Chronicle. They had two daughters.

He was diagnosed with cancer in the mid-2010s, which recurred in 2018, including a brain tumor for which he underwent surgery. In February 2019, he announced on social media that it had "spread to his organs". He died on December 9, 2021, at the age of 59.
