= Jamestown Press =

Newspaper published in Jamestown, Rhode Island

- An Independent Newspaper
- Type: Weekly newspaper
- Format: Broadsheet
- Owner: Robert Berczuk
- Founder(s): Peter J. and Barbara Malloy
- Publisher: Robert Berczuk
- Editor: Tim Riel
- Founded: 1989
- Headquarters: 45 Narragansett Avenue, Jamestown, Rhode Island United States
- Circulation: 4,667 (as of January 2022)
- Website: jamestownpress.com

The Jamestown Press is a weekly newspaper published in Jamestown in the U.S. state of Rhode Island. It was founded in April 1989 by Peter J. and Barbara Malloy. The current owner of the Jamestown Press is Robert Berczuk. The paper is published on Thursdays. Digital archives of the Jamestown Press are available through the Jamestown Philomenian Library.

== History ==
The paper has served as the town of Jamestown's newspaper of record since 1991, providing an outlet for town announcements, school board reports, and other town-related news.

Jeff McDonough owned the paper from 1990 to 2015, purchasing the paper from Peter J. Malloy shortly before Malloy died. McDonough also owned the Block Island Times for a short period of time, before selling that paper to Bruce Montgomery and other employees of the Block Island Times, though he continued to publish the paper after he sold it to them. Jeff McDonough later made local headlines when an ex-lover accused him of "playing hardball" with her competing paper, 02835:The Jamestown Journal, to remain the town's paper of record. 02835:The Jamestown Journal had bid an ad rate of $4.35 per inch to the town, which was less than the town was paying for ad space in the Jamestown Press. McDonough and the Press counter-bid at $0 per inch and remained the town's designated paper of record.

Jamestown Press' weekly columnist, Sue Maden, was profiled in the New York Times in 2009 for her "Save the Best for Last" post-Thanksgiving dinners, which she began hosting in 1999 after her husband died. The article noted that Maden, who co-authored the books Historic Tales of Jamestown, Jamestown: A History of Narragansett Bay's Island Town, and Legendary Locals of Jamestown, invites colleagues from the Jamestown Press to join the dinners. In the forward for their books, Maden and co-author Rosemary Enright (who also writes columns for the Jamestown Press) thank the paper for its support, including providing access to its photos and publications. As of August 2018, Sue Maden and Rosemary Enright still write columns for the Jamestown Press.

In December 2015, McDonough sold the newspaper to journalist Robert Berczuk and retired from the newspaper industry. As of 2018, the Press' writing staff consists of editor Tim Riel and reporters Ryan Gibbs and Matt Wunsch. The newspaper also runs the nationally syndicated comic strip Wallace the Brave, which is drawn and written by Jamestown resident Will Henry Wilson.
