= The Argyle Sweater =

American comic strip by Scott Hilburn

- Author: Scott Hilburn
- Website: www.theargylesweater.com
- Current status/schedule: Current daily strip
- Launch date: 2008; 17 years ago
- Syndicate(s): Universal Press Syndicate/Universal Uclick/Andrews McMeel Syndication
- Genre: Humor

The Argyle Sweater is an American daily comic strip written by Scott Hilburn, from Garland, Texas. The strip has been syndicated by Universal Press Syndicate (now Andrews McMeel Syndication) since April 2008.

The comic bears a strong resemblance to Gary Larson's The Far Side comic, which Hilburn acknowledges. In 2008, he told the Houston Chronicle, "There's no doubt that I was heavily influenced by Larson. He's one of the greats." Hilburn also lists among his influences cartoons in The New Yorker and National Lampoon magazines as well as cartoonists Sam Gross, Tom Cheney, and Jack Ziegler.
