= Bad Reporter =

Editorial cartoon comic strip

- Lead panel of the Bad Reporter strip.
- Author: Don Asmussen
- Website: www.gocomics.com/badreporter
- Current status/schedule: Semi-weekly
- Launch date: September 25, 2003 entered syndication August 12, 2005
- End date: April 30, 2021
- Syndicate(s): Universal Press Syndicate (2005–2011); Andrews McMeel Syndication (2011–2021)
- Genre(s): Topical humor, satire, current events

Bad Reporter is a semi-weekly editorial cartoon in comic strip format written and illustrated by Don Asmussen that ran from 2003 to 2021. It first appeared in the San Francisco Chronicle on September 25, 2003. After being syndicated by Universal Press Syndicate from August 12, 2005 to 2011, it was distributed by Andrews McMeel Syndication until 2021.

It typically contained four panels, the first a simple black panel with a caricature of creator Asmussen and the slogan "The lies behind the truth, and the truth behind those lies that are behind that truth". The remaining three panels were spoofs (parodies) of newspaper articles containing a mock-up of a prominent newspaper masthead (such as the Chronicle or The New York Times), a headline, a simulated photograph, and a short text introduction or lead. Images were often obviously doctored file photographs or images from recent newspapers. Often there were humorous sidebars and other graphics.

The strip grew out of an earlier effort for the paper titled The San Francisco Comic Strip. Its first topic was the recall of Governor Gray Davis in 2003. It then covered the 2004 presidential election and subsequent events.

Portion of January 19, 2007 strip.

The humor was generally topical and absurdist, describing one local or national current event in the terms and context of another. The strip often focuses on political scandals in San Francisco, California. For example, a panel from one 2007 strip describes a notorious brawl between students at a local Catholic high school and a visiting Yale University a cappella glee club in terms usually used with respect to the Iraq War (the 2003 United States military action in Iraq), with local celebrities the Brown Twins humorously portrayed as "warlords" who want the college singer "occupiers" out "right now."

Bad Reporter concluded on April 30, 2021, approximately eighth months before Asmussen's death.
