= Andrews McMeel Universal =

American media corporation

Andrews McMeel Universal, Inc.

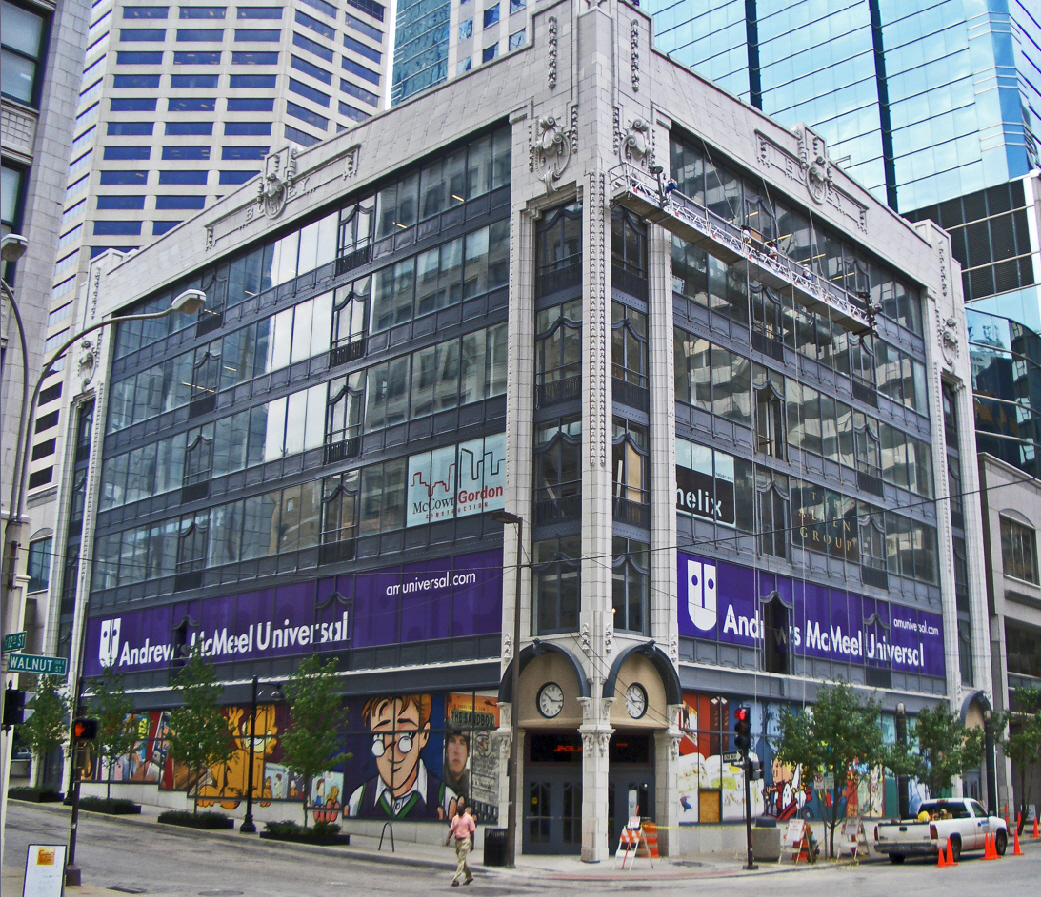
- Formerly: Universal Press Syndicate (1970–1997)
- Type: Private
- Industry: Media and publishing
- Founded: 1970; 56 years ago
- Founders: John McMeel and Jim Andrews
- Headquarters: Kansas City, Missouri, U.S.
- Area served: United States
- Key people: Kirsty Melville (CEO)
- Divisions: Andrews McMeel Syndication; Andrews McMeel Publishing; AMUSE (Andrews McMeel Universal Syndicated Entertainment); GoComics
- Website: http://www.amuniversal.com

Andrews McMeel Universal (AMU) is an American media corporation based in Kansas City, Missouri. It was founded in 1970 by Jim Andrews and John McMeel as Universal Press Syndicate and was renamed in 1997 to AMU to reflect the diversification that had taken place since its founding. It has the subdivisions:

- Andrews McMeel Syndication, which includes GoComics
- Andrews McMeel Publishing (established 1973)
- AMUSE (Andrews McMeel Universal Syndicated Entertainment)

== Headquarters ==
The company headquarters is located in downtown Kansas City, Missouri in the historic Boley Building. The six-story steel frame building was constructed in 1909 and was designed in the Art Nouveau style by architect Louis Curtiss. The building is one of the world's first metal-and-glass curtain-wall buildings and the first to use rolled-steel columns. It was listed on the National Register of Historic Places in 1971.
