= Stone Soup (comic strip) =

American comic strip by Jan Eliot

- Author(s): Jan Eliot
- Current status/schedule: Concluded
- Launch date: (syndication) November 1995; 29 years ago
- End date: July 2020
- Alternate name(s): Sister City (1990–1995)
- Syndicate(s): Universal Press Syndicate/Universal Uclick/Andrews McMeel Syndication (1995–present)
- Genre(s): Humor, Politics, Family

Stone Soup is an American newspaper comic strip. It was created by cartoonist Jan Eliot as Sister City, and was renamed after being syndicated by Universal Press Syndicate in 1995. The strip originally ran daily until 2015, when it switched to Sunday strips only before ending in 2020. The strip centers on a single mother named Valerie Stone, and her struggles to raise her daughters Alix and Holly.

== Publication history ==
The comic strip was created by Jan Eliot. It began as a weekly in 1990, and ran for five years in the Eugene, Oregon Register-Guard under the name Sister City before being syndicated. The syndicated daily strip debuted in November 1995.

Stone Soup featured as a daily strip for 20 years until October 2015, when Eliot decided she no longer wanted to draw a daily comic, to devote more time to travel, socialize and focus on other creative projects. She continued to create a Sunday cartoon strip.

The Stone family features a family headed by single mother Val, an uncommon contrast with the ordinary nuclear family depicted in more traditional strips. As the author explained,

When I write I am writing first and foremost for single and working parents. I often felt very isolated and "put down" because of my circumstances (I was a single working mom for 10 years). I even had a teacher tell me that their school "was a better place before all the single moms arrived". My daughters both turned out fabulously, thank you, and I think I was a good parent.

It is common for strip storylines to consist of household arguments that are not resolved. Unlike many strips, the characters do age, but at a very slow rate. Val has celebrated her 38th and 39th birthdays in the strip; Alix and Holly were 9 and 12 when the strip began, and are now 10 and 13.

On 15 June 2020, Jan Eliot announced her retirement and that Stone Soup would end on 26 July 2020.

== Symbology ==
The strip was named for the folk tale about Stone Soup, with the focus that good things can be created with small contributions from many sources.

== Characters ==
=== Main characters ===
Sisters Valerie (Val) and Joan live across the fence from each other.

- Valerie (Val) Stone is a 39-year-old widow, at the start of the strip, with two young daughters. Her previous husband, Tom, died of an undisclosed illness when Alix was very young and Holly was around five years old. She has a professional job which allows her to help support her mother and, in the early years, her sister Joan. On the job, she is openly disconcerted by her co-workers' political machinations. Her home life, however, is the greater source of aggravation, especially when dealing with the antics of her daughters. She loves women's sports. In July 2015, she married motorcycle police officer Phil Jackson.
- Holly Stone is Val's 13-year-old daughter, prone to vanity, entitlement, and getting into fights with her younger sister Alix. She is the stereotypical teenager, viewing her family as "abnormal." She rarely passes up an opportunity to challenge her mother (she taught Alix to say 'Muhhhtherr') and sees almost everything in terms of herself ("In what universe is tuna noodle surprise a reward?"). She loves dressing in revealing or provocative clothes, but she is a feminist at heart and enjoys playing basketball.
- Alix Stone is Val's 10-year-old daughter, a blissfully naive (and pugnacious) tomboy mystified by her sister's histrionics, but often easily influenced by her illogical and lazy behavior (like wearing flip-flops in the November cold). She still has the innocence of youth but Holly tries to teach her cynicism and sarcasm. Val considers her the model of calm and reason among the chaos, almost all of which comes from Holly ("I dress like someone who values freedom and mobility over style").
- "Gramma" Evie Stone travels the world with her husband Arnold. She visits the family occasionally, and Skypes often. She lived with her daughter Val and granddaughters from the inception of the strip, until 2009. She comes across as crotchety and overly stern with her family, but cuts loose in Reno or when painting. She has no patience for modern parenting methods and rarely passes up the chance to express her views on anything. The kids regard her as a mixed blessing, especially since underneath it all she can often be a barrel of fun. Her cooking is generally much better received than Val's. In 2006, she went abroad to Uganda to build houses for an aid organization. It was revealed in a strip that she had gotten a tattoo of a butterfly on her shoulder sometimes in her 60s, much to the dismay of Val and Joan. On November 27, 2009, she went to Thailand to work with Habitat for Humanity where she met her now-husband Arnold, with whom she travels the world on humanitarian voyages. Her daughters worry about her. On 1 July 2010, she told Val she was coming home for the summer as she (Val) could use the help with the girls. On 14 July 2010, she arrived at a very joyous family reunion with her oldest and the grandkids. In the summer of 2014, Evie married Arnold while visiting him in South Africa. She continues to be a part of her family's lives through video chat.
- Joan Stone is 36 years old, rarely seen without her glasses on. She is Val's younger sister. At the start of the strip, Joan was an unemployed single mother and dependent on Val. Her son's father was Leon, called "Uncle Leon" by Alix. Joan begins a self-employed freelance copywriting remote work business. Joan took back her maiden name after her divorce, and kept it when she married Wally in strips that ran on Oct 14-15, 2000.
- Wally Weinstein, introduced in 1995, is Val's down-to-earth next-door neighbor. Wally married Joan in 2000 after a long engagement. A balding and bespectacled insurance salesman, he can cook, loves being a dad, and is handy with tools. He thinks hot chocolate and donuts are a panacea.
- Andy Gilburt is Wally's 16-year-old nephew, who doesn't think too highly of rules but has no qualms about playing hard rock music at earsplitting levels. Andy moved in with Wally during Wally and Joan's engagement. He has endeared himself to Holly in countless ways. Recently his parents decided to divorce and Andy chose to live permanently with Wally and Joan.
- Max Krabowsky is 3 years old. He is the preschool-aged son of Joan from her first marriage, and Wally's stepson. Max has two stock emotions: thrilled with life or utterly miserable. He worships action figures, as evidenced by his sudden comprehension of potty training simply by wearing superhero underwear (much to Joan's dismay).
- Luci Stone Weinstein, Wally and Joan's daughter, and Max's younger half-sister, was born in strips that ran on July 6–8, 2007 (although her birth certificate stated that she was born on July 8, at 1:30 AM, weighing 9 lbs., 8 oz.) after a pregnancy storyline that began in October 2006.
- Phil Jackson, Val's new husband, was introduced in the book Stone Soup The Comic Strip. He is a motorcycle police officer, and the campus cop at Holly's school. He fears the world is becoming too hurried for his liking. He was Val's on-and-off boyfriend, breaking up when he "freaked out" about dating someone with children. In strips collected in the "Desperate Households" book (2007) they are reunited. In December 2014, Phil asked Val to marry him and she agreed. Val and Phil married in July 2015. Early on his complexion was slightly darker than Val's, and at one point was referred to as "white" by Alix. However, over time his skin tone became darker until he was almost certainly African American. His aunt, Junie Ferguson, lives just down the street from Val. Per her, the family's background is "African, Portuguese and Irish. My nephew came out looking more Portuguese; I came out more African." Junie seems to be a good friend of Val's mom, Evie.

=== Recurring characters ===
- Norton Dickerson is Val's coworker and adversary. He is the stereotypical "suck-up" in the office. When he's not brownnosing the boss, he tries to impress Val with tales of entertaining their boss on his (Dickerson's) boat. In strips collected in the 2007 "Desperate Households" book, Dickerson is laid off as was Val, but she gets re-hired after the company starts to spiral downward. Dickerson has yet to return. Everyone thinks he has a thing for Val, though she doesn't really believe it. Dickerson apparently lives with his mother.
- Rena is Val's office buddy and confidante. Working with Val reminds Rena to enjoy being single and childless. When it comes to cooking, she doesn't think outside the box ("make?").
- Leon Krabowsky is Joan's first husband and Max's biological father. He went out for milk one night and ended up in the Virgin Islands. Leon and Joan are divorced when the strip begins, but he occasionally drops by to mooch.
- Susan is the neighborhood vet who also coaches the girls' basketball team. She once dated Wally but they broke up when he found out that she didn't want kids and he did. Sometimes while Val and Phil weren't together, she and Phil dated (this was never seen in the books).
- Biscuit is the apple of Max's eye, but to everyone else, a "yappy little mutt". Officially Holly and Alix's dog is found as a stray, the girls bring her home and promise to take care of the little pup - originally named "Lily" but the family decided on "Biscuit" since she seems to answer to the name. Val provides care and Max provides adoration. Biscuit has a thing for Val's bunny slippers. During Biscuit's first visit to Susan the vet, it is revealed that Biscuit is female.

==== Val's book club ====
Val belongs to a book club with an assortment of characters from other strips, including Elly from For Better or For Worse, Alice from Dilbert, Rose/Vicki the biker chick from Rose Is Rose, and Connie Duncan, the mom from Zits. Cathy was mentioned, but "couldn't come till she found the right man and lost 10 pounds." The book club also threw a baby shower for Joan, which takes place in the book There's No "WE" in Crowning (published in 2007). This is a short collection that takes the reader from the first onset of Joan's pregnancy till the birth of Luci by a midwife at home. Strips featuring the book club have appeared on at least three occasions and are republished in the 2005 trade paperback collection. (See below.)

== Critical reception and politics ==
=== Commemorative strip, September 11, 2011 ===
Along with 92 other cartoon strips, Eliot was invited to commemorate 9/11 in her daily cartoon in 2011, the 10th anniversary of the attacks.

=== Political plotline, April 2012 ===
In general, the cartoon strip has more of a domestic, than political focus. However, in April 2012, Stone Soup had a two-week plotline which featured support for universal health care, criticism of U.S. Policy in the Middle East, and made an unflattering remark about Dick Cheney. Eliot's goal was to encourage political participation and to spark discussion and debate, regardless of anyone's ideology. Some papers such as the Daily Herald received both complaints that the politicized or "biased" content should be on the Opinions or Editorial page, contrasted with compliments that Eliot had captured how the majority of women feel about America's politicians, politics and government.

== Stone Soup collections ==
| Title | Publication Date | ISBN | Publisher |
|---|---|---|---|
| Stone Soup | 1997 | ISBN 0-8362289-3-6 | Andrews McMeel Publishing (later republished by Four Panel Press) |
| You Can't Say Boobs on Sunday | 1999 | ISBN 0-9674102-0-7 | Four Panel Press |
| Stone Soup The Comic Strip | 2001 | ISBN 0-9674102-1-5 | Four Panel Press |
| Road Kill in the Closet | 2003 | ISBN 0-9674102-3-1 | Four Panel Press |
| Not So Picture Perfect | 2005 | ISBN 0-9674102-5-8 | Four Panel Press |
| Desperate Households | 2007 | ISBN 0-7407-6429-2 | Andrews McMeel Publishing |
| There's No "We" in Crowning! | 2007 | none | Universal Press Syndicate (only available from Lulu) |
| Ho Ho Ho: A Stone Soup Christmas | 2007 | none | Universal Press Syndicate (only available from Lulu) |
| This Might Not Be Pretty | 2008 | ISBN 0-9674102-6-6 | Four Panel Press |
| We'll Be Really Careful | 2011 | ISBN 978-0-9674102-7-2 | Four Panel Press |
| Brace Yourself | 2011 | ISBN 0-9674102-8-2 | Four Panel Press |
| It Seemed Like A Good Idea At The Time | 2014 | ISBN 0-9674102-9-0 | Four Panel Press |
| Privacy is for wussies | 2016 | ISBN 9780967410241 | Four Panel Press |

== See also ==
- List of women in comics
