= Pooch Café =

Comic strip

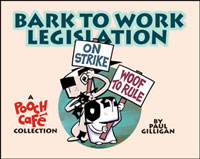
- Poncho and Boomer
- Author(s): Paul Gilligan
- Website: www.gocomics.com/poochcafe
- Current status/schedule: Current daily strip
- Launch date: January 3, 2000
- End date: Still in production
- Syndicate(s): Copley News Service (2000-2003); Universal Press Syndicate/Universal Uclick/Andrews McMeel Syndication (2003-present)
- Publisher(s): Andrews McMeel Publishing
- Genre(s): Humour, gag-a-day

Pooch Café is a Canadian gag-a-day comic strip written and illustrated by Paul Gilligan. It was also made into a series of online shorts with RingTales.

Gilligan is also the writer for the comic Poptropica, which debuted on June 9, 2014, ended its run on November 11, 2015, and is based on the video game of the same name.

== Overview ==
Pooch Café follows a self-serving, paranoid dog named Poncho and his life with his master Chazz, Chazz's cat-loving wife Carmen, Carmen's pet cats, and a zen goldfish named "Fish". A great deal of the strip focuses on Poncho's adventures with his fellow dogs: Boomer, Hudson, Droolia, Gus, Beaumont (or "Bobo", the owner of the titular cafe), and Poo Poo. Other semi-recurring characters are Tito (the garbage man), Sheldon (a pigeon with a pork pie hat), and Margo (the dog-walker). The strip takes its name from the cafe where Poncho and his friends gather to compare notes (and complain) about life among the humans.

The universe of the comic strip is one in which dogs are recognizably canine in some of their behavior but with many anthropomorphic traits. For example, Chazz, Carmen, and other human characters are able to talk not just to Poncho but to Poncho's dog friends as well, all seeming to speak the same language. The dogs however are rarely able to communicate with cats - who speak only cat—and therefore the cats are rarely seen speaking. Fish for some reason is able to speak all languages. There has been one instance of Carmen seemingly being unable to understand Poncho and referring to what he is saying as simply barking.

Many people attach commendable characteristics to dogs, such as loyalty and unconditional love. However, Poncho embodies other less-dwelt-upon traits; he's greedy and self-serving, a fact of which he is blissfully aware. Poncho hates cats with a passion, and dreams of the day he and his canine companions can catapult all the cats of the world into the sun. This plan is often referred to during the dogs' "Catapult-All-Cats-Into-The-Sun" meetings, which are led by Boomer. Chazz and Carmen are often driven to their wits' end by his constant schemes, but still love him unconditionally, tough though it may be. Poncho also holds a grudge against Carmen for coming between the sacred master/dog relationship he shares with Chazz and for forcing them to live with cats. He often designs schemes to pit the couple against each other, delighting in any turmoil that subsequently ensues. Poncho is also neutered, a subject that is frequently examined and mocked by Gus and Boomer whenever Mitzi, a female poodle who used to live on the same street as Poncho, drops by the cafe. According to Poncho, they are "just friends".

Poncho and his friends often get into bizarre situations, such as the time he and Poo Poo ended up inside a Narnia-esque world accessed through Droolia's armpit; the time Poncho got locked up by Canine Security for being cat-contaminated; and the time Poncho and Hudson got lost in the snow, were rescued by a cat, rescued a mailman, and Poncho became Dog Hobo King.

The strip is set in contemporary North America. Poncho appears in most of the strips, while a small number focus on other supporting characters. The broad themes of the strip deal with Poncho's misadventures, his unique views on cats, and his relationships and interactions with other characters in his society.

Pooch Café is syndicated by Universal Press Syndicate after a short time with Copley's syndicate, and currently appears in approximately 275 papers worldwide. There are two book collections (temporarily out of print but being reprinted in spring 2009) and a third book entitled Bark to Work Legislation.

The creator runs a blog, where fans can connect with Paul Gilligan and interact with other fans on its message board. There has even been some speculation that a few recent strips may have been influenced during this open fan/author dialogue.

== Characters ==
Main Characters:

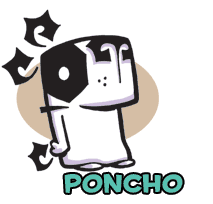
Poncho The main character. A greedy, conniving, cynical little dog who runs pyramid schemes and money laundering operations, but has also been known to help animals in need.

Chazz Poncho's master. He loves Carmen and Poncho, and attempts to stay neutral in their arguments, though he is shown to think dogs are better. His full name is Chazz Palmer.

Carmen Chazz's wife and a cat person. She and Poncho have an antagonistic relationship, due to Poncho blaming her for forcing him and Chazz to live in a house full of cats.

Boomer Poncho's best friend and alpha male of the pack. Tolerant of Poncho's schemes, but abandons his best friend when things start going badly. He heads the Catapult-all-cats-into-the-sun project, and is frustrated at their lack of progress.

Hudson A well-meaning, but naive Beagle who is close friends with Poncho and Boomer, and often a reluctant pawn in the former's schemes. He inadvertently foiled their plan to get cats banned from their town by stamping out the word 'dogs' with the cat paw print maker Poncho invented. He is usually seen with Poncho and Boomer.

Fish A goldfish. Chazz bought him to even the odds a bit between Poncho and the cats.

Poo Poo A male Bichon Frise who has trouble with his masculinity. He and Poncho often team up whenever they feel like the odds in the pack are stacked against them. Despite seeming small and weak, he has an inner demon (and no interest in Droolia).

Droolia A slobbery female Bullmastiff who is in love with Poo Poo, much to his annoyance.

Beaumont The proprietor and Bartender of Pooch Café.

Gus A male Scottish Terrier, he mocks Poncho, and often hits on Mitzi.

Minor Characters

- Party Monster - A dog at the café who lives in a fraternity house.
- Cats - Carmen's thirteen cats.
- Neville - The mailman that Poncho uses mental torture on, instead of biting him like the other dogs. They were once trapped at the café together during a snowstorm.
- Stinky - A skunk that Poncho is friends with. Being easily startled, he often sprays Poncho by accident.
- Sheldon - A pigeon friend of Poncho's. Poncho often tries to help with his love life.
- Squirrels - Random squirrels that the dogs chase. They once set up a cafe next to Pooch Café, sparking a war. They also like to bully Poncho.
- Pops - An elderly dog at the café who tells stories of his outlandish youth.
- Margo - Poncho's dogwalker. She hates Poncho and ended up in a mental institution because of him.
- Poncho's Inner Dog - A naive, drunk, little clown dog inside Poncho.
- Benjamin Franklin (Also known as Benjamin) - The mailman's dog. Because of this, Poncho often makes fun of him.
- Mitzi - A female dog who is friends with Poncho. She has shown varying degrees of interest in him in the past.
- Justin - Poncho's vet.
- Gordy - The Border Collie. He brings his sheep to the café, which annoys Poncho and Boomer.
- Birds - Random birds at the park that Poncho and Boomer chase.

== Recurring subject matter ==
Some recurring themes in the strip include: Poncho's dislike of cats; the giant cat-catapult the dogs are trying to build to hurl all the Earth's cats into the Sun; his fear of the squirrels in the backyard; his weakness for the use of Havarti cheese as a bargaining tool; his longing to taste Zebra; his infatuation with Jackie Chan; Carmen's not-so-secret crush on Justin Timberlake; Chazz's embarrassment of having to hold an umbrella over Poncho while he does his business in rainy weather; his timid skunk friend "Stinky" who goes off with very little provocation; his attempts to please and improve the life of his friend Fish by taking him for walks or setting him up with on-line dates; his attempts to incur a positive karmic balance by helping the personality-impaired pigeon Sheldon; his emotional connection to his Plank Of Wood, a remnant from the porch he was born under many years ago; various body parts that resemble urges: such as the stomach for hunger or the brain for cleverness; Poncho's hatred of the mailman and medication for motion sickness; Poncho's loud and near-continuous shouts about needing his WALKIES! (especially when Chazz and Carmen are decommissioned and no one else wants to come within a century of him).

== Award nominations ==
Pooch Café was nominated for "Best Comic Strip" by the National Cartoonists Society in 2008; the award is referred to as the Reuben Award.

== Collections ==
As of 2008, three book collections were published.

Title	Publication Date	ISBN	Publisher
All Dogs Naturally Know How to Swim	2003	ISBN 0-7407-3302-8	Andrews McMeel
No Collar, No Service	2005	ISBN 0-7407-5003-8	Andrews McMeel
Bark to Work Legislation	2007	none	Universal Press Syndicate (only available from Lulu)

Paul Gilligan self-published a fourth book in September 2011 called Poncho: Year One - a puppy's life. It is a collection of strips in the form of a graphic novel which spans 18 months of the strip telling the story of the first year of Poncho's life.

== Web Shorts ==
In 2011, in a collaboration with RingTales, a series of animated shorts were created and released online.

== Film ==
In January 2008, Paul Gilligan, the comic strip's author, revealed on his website that Sony Pictures Animation has signed to make a computer-animated feature film based on the strip. Gilligan then wrote several story treatments and screenplay drafts. In October 2011, it was announced that Kelly Asbury had been hired to write the next script draft. In April 2013, on a Twitter Q/A session, Gilligan responded to a question whether there will be a Pooch Cafe film: "Alas, Poncho's movie plans got scuttled by a certain director who I won't bother naming..."
