= Royal Comics Syndicate =

- Company type: Print and digital syndicate
- Industry: Comics
- Founded: 2004; 22 years ago
- Founder: Timo Kähkönen
- Headquarters: Finland
- Website: RoyalComics.com

Royal Comics Syndicate is a Finnish comics syndicate that was founded in 2004 by comic artist Timo Kähkönen. The syndicate's ongoing goal is to internationalize domestic comics by operating as an agent for comic artists and selling the publishing rights to newspapers, magazines, and other media, on their behalf. Kähkönen's most famous comic is Paikallisuutisia (Local News).

== Comics ==
Royal is currently distributing six comics series. All of them are being published in Finland. As of 2011, Local News is also being published in Norway and Dark Side of the Horse on the GoComics and Yahoo! News websites.

- Paikallisuutisia (Local News)
- Kapine (Tin-Bin)
- Loikan vuoksi (Urban Leap)
- Musta hevonen (Dark Side of the Horse)
- Sekametsä (Mixed Forest)
- Viljo ja Esteri (Bill and Esther)
