= Kelly & Duke =

Comic strip published during the 1970s in newspapers

- Author: Jack Moore
- Current status/schedule: Concluded daily & Sunday strip
- Launch date: July 10, 1972; 53 years ago
- End date: June 18, 1980; 46 years ago
- Alternate name: Kelly (1972–1974)
- Syndicate(s): Universal Press Syndicate
- Genre: Humor

Kelly & Duke was a daily and Sunday comic strip drawn and written by Jack Moore and syndicated by Universal Press Syndicate. It began on July 10, 1972, then known as Kelly, but changed to the Kelly & Duke title on December 8, 1974. It ended on June 18, 1980.

== Cast of characters ==
The strip centers on a boy named Kelly, whose pet and best friend is Duke, an anthropomorphic dog with a Southern accent. The strip's cast was made up of Roscoe, a beatnik cat., and Johnny Dundalk, an obstreperous rooster.

== Adaptation ==
There were no book collections of Kelly and Duke, although a children's book based on the strip, What is God's Area Code?, was published in 1974 as part of the Cartoon Stories for the New Children.
