= Ink Pen =

American comic strip by Phil Dunlap

- From left to right: Captain Victorious, Scrappy Lad, Ralston, Bixby, Fritz and Hamhock
- Author: Phil Dunlap
- Current status/schedule: Concluded daily; in reruns
- Launch date: 7 November 2005
- End date: October 2012
- Syndicate(s): Universal Press Syndicate/Universal Uclick
- Publisher: Andrews McMeel Publishing
- Genre: superheroes

Ink Pen is an American daily comic strip by Phil Dunlap which was syndicated by Universal Press Syndicate/Universal Uclick from 2005 to 2012.

The strip is about an employment agency for out-of-work cartoon characters. As of October 2012, the daily strip ended its syndication. Although there were announced plans to have new weekly comics running concurrently after a brief hiatus, this has not happened.

== Characters ==
Some of the characters include:

- Bixby -- the former child star and now a dirty rat who works at the agency.
- Captain Victorious -- a lazy super hero with a would-be sidekick, Scrappy Lad, that he doesn't want.
- Dynaman -- the rival of Captain Victorious.
- Fritz -- a dog and boss of the agency.
- Hamhock -- a pig who is trying to get his 15 minutes of fame.
- Hel -- the Norse goddess of the Underworld, with a surprisingly cheerful disposition. She claims to be related to Tyr, but their kinship is rather tenuous.
- Jenn Erica -- a female filler character who tries repeatedly to get a lead character.
- Moxie Gumption -- a more streetwise version of Little Orphan Annie.
- Mr. Negato -- the enemy of Captain Victorious.
- Ms. Amazement -- gives the impression of being a parody of Wonder Woman, but her background is Celtic rather than Greek.
- Ralston -- a rabbit who is just looking for a higher group of people.
- Scrappy Lad -- the would-be sidekick of Captain Victorious who is interested in Moxie Gumption.
- Tyr -- the Norse god of single combat, trying to pull his decent weight around anger management and Valhallan Attitude.
