= News of the Weird =

Syndicated newspaper column

News of the Weird is a syndicated newspaper column originated by Chuck Shepherd that collects bizarre news stories. It was created in 1988.

In 1997, High Five Entertainment and MG/Perin planned to syndicate a television version of the show, made to look like a newscast featuring unusual stories.

As of 2006, it is syndicated by Universal Press Syndicate and published in more than 250 newspapers in the United States and Canada. As of July 2008, the daily internet column has merged with two other "weird" websites to form Weird Universe.

Shepherd published his last column on July 2, 2017. In the following week, columns were credited to "the Editors at Andrews McMeel". The September 9, 2022 column revealed that Shepherd died the previous day.
