= Real Life Adventures =

American comic strip by Lance Aldrich and Gary Wise

- Author(s): Lance Aldrich
- Illustrator(s): Gary Wise
- Website: www.gocomics.com/reallifeadventures
- Current status/schedule: Current daily strip
- Launch date: March 24, 1991; 33 years ago
- Syndicate(s): Universal Press Syndicate/Universal Uclick/Andrews McMeel Syndication (2003-present)
- Publisher(s): Andrews McMeel Publishing
- Genre(s): Humour, gag-a-day

Real Life Adventures is a nationally syndicated daily comic strip created by Lance Aldrich and Gary Wise and launched on March 24, 1991. It is most often a single-panel strip, except for Sundays. The strip deals with everyday foibles.

The comic's creators were former advertising executives from Southfield, Michigan who began creating the comic strip in 1991.

In the fall of 2023, Aldrich and Wise retired. Beginning on October 16, 2023, the daily panels of Real Life Adventures were in rerun status. The Sunday November 12, 2023 strip was the last original content.
