= John McPherson (cartoonist) =

American cartoonist

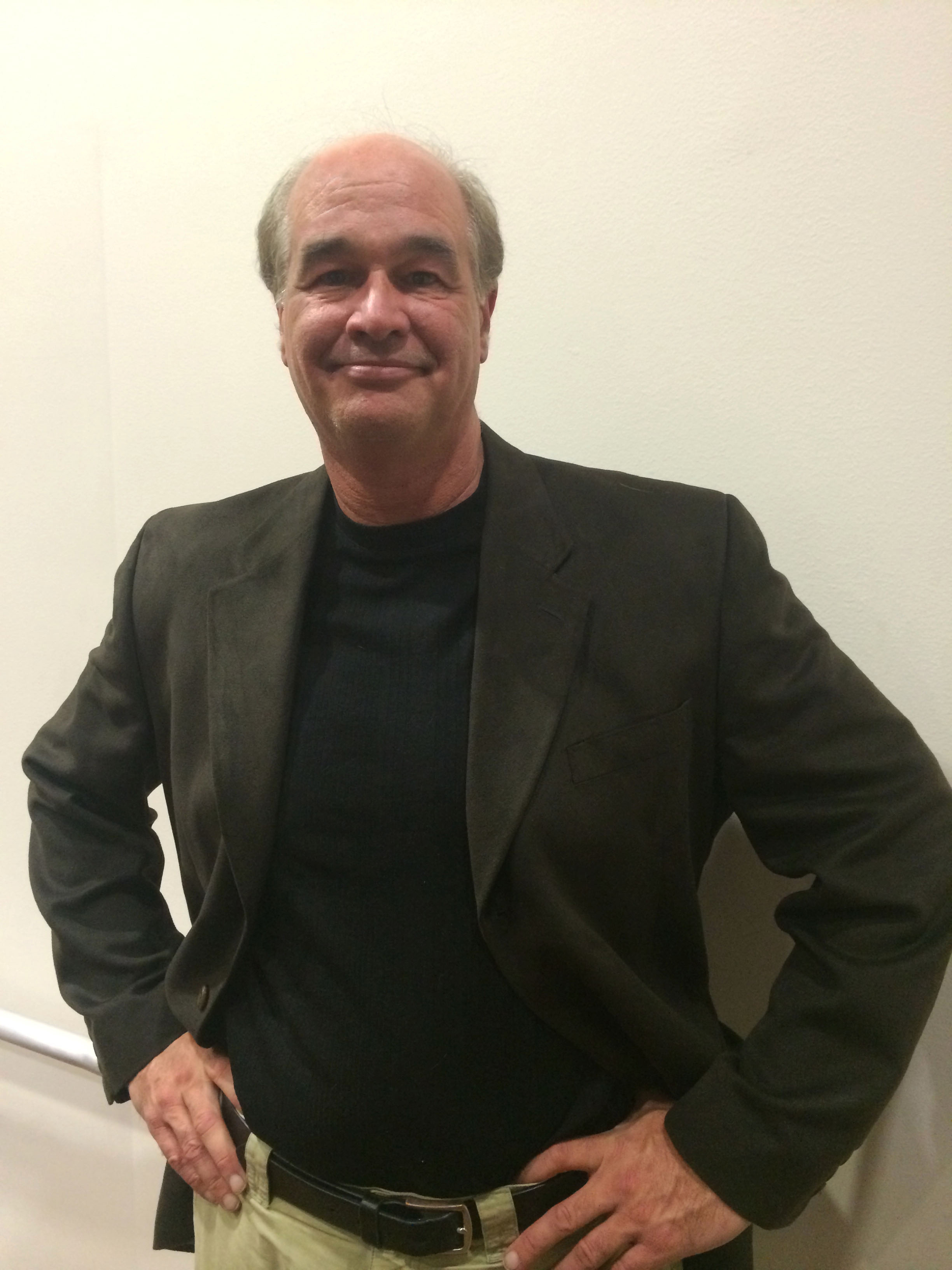
John McPherson

John McPherson (born August 19, 1959) is an American cartoonist best known for Close to Home. In the 1990s John decided to leave his engineering job and focus on free-lance cartoons. Close to Home debuted in 1992 and went on to appear in over 600 papers worldwide, including The Washington Post, New York Daily News, Miami Herald and The Japan Times.
