= Liō =

American comic strip by Mark Tatulli

- Liō strip from July 26, 2006
- Author: Mark Tatulli
- Website: www.gocomics.com/lio
- Current status/schedule: Current daily strip
- Launch date: May 15, 2006; 20 years ago
- Syndicate(s): Universal Press Syndicate/Universal Uclick/Andrews McMeel Syndication
- Publisher: Andrews McMeel Publishing
- Genre(s): Gag-a-day, Pantomime comics, Comedy horror

Liō is a daily comic strip created by American artist Mark Tatulli and distributed by Universal Press Syndicate/Universal Uclick/Andrews McMeel Syndication since May 15, 2006. As a pantomime strip, it has an international appeal. In 2008, the strip brought Tatulli a National Cartoonists Society Newspaper Comic Strip Award.

== Publication history ==
The strip debuted on May 15, 2006, in more than 100 newspapers which included The Atlanta Journal-Constitution, The Dallas Morning News, Detroit Free Press, Houston Chronicle, Los Angeles Times, Denver's Rocky Mountain News, Raleigh News and Observer, The Seattle Times, St. Petersburg Times and The Washington Post. The strip is mostly wordless, therefore it can easily be marketed worldwide; one paper, De Morgen, a Brussels-based Flemish newspaper, introduced the strip on the day it debuted. As of August 2007, Liō runs in more than 330 newspapers worldwide.

== Characters and story ==
The strip focuses on the adventures of a creative little boy, Liō, who lives with his father (unnamed in the strip) and various monsters, animals, aliens, lab creations, and other creatures. Liō's mother is deceased. It is currently unknown how she died. The setting of the story varies from Liō's house to his school and the general outside world. The time period appears to be contemporary, except for an episode set in the year 2101, when Liō is in his nineties but still very much capable of mischief.

The story is told visually, with little or no dialogue. Gags frequently involve the supernatural, alien invasion or mass destruction of many sorts, creating a surreal, disturbing atmosphere. Some of the strip's recurring themes involve Liō getting even with grade-school bullies, helping animals (most of which are non-anthropomorphic but display obvious intelligence) defend themselves against humans or their predators, and performing mad scientist-style experiments. He is often seen using robots that he constructs himself for causing mischief. Another recurring gag in the strip is parody of other famous comic strips, including Cathy, For Better or For Worse, Garfield, Zits, Calvin and Hobbes, Blondie, Peanuts, Pearls Before Swine, The Family Circus and Berkeley Breathed's strips.

In addition to Liō, the strip only has one other major character, Liō's unnamed father. He is frequently shown to be the subject of Liō's pranks, and sometimes he has to get his son out of difficult situations. When he watched a news report of an alien invasion, he gave Liō a spanking for apparently having piloted the alien ship and parking it in the backyard. On the other hand, one day when the boy came home from school dejected because a drawing he created had horrified the faculty, Dad proudly hung up the piece of art on the refrigerator, giving his son much-needed comfort and joy. Quite often, father and son prove that they really love each other, no matter what.

Liō has at least five companion animals:

- Fido, a spider who has helped him cheat on tests.
- Cybil, a white cat who has unique methods for getting Liō to feed her. She looks sweet and innocent but is not. She also has an affinity for gin.
- Frank, a cobra who sometimes sleeps in Liō's bed.
- Ishmael, a giant squid, mainly identified as a cephalopod.
- Mittens, a lobster rescued from his father's planned dinner.

There are several frequently recurring characters:

- Liō's hunchbacked assistant.
- His grade-school teacher Mrs. Gatchi.
- A group of school bullies.
- Assorted mythical monsters (both alive and undead).
- Assorted aliens.
- Various lab creations (some alive, some robots).
- Eva Rose, a violent girl with bangs that cover her eyes and an interest in surgeries and autopsies. Liō has a crush on her. She does not return the feeling and is often quite violent towards him or his expressions of love. This does not sway Liō in the slightest, except maybe to make him even more determined in his quest to win her love.
- Bubbles, Liō's wide-eyed infant cousin who is scared of nothing and comes up with devious plots.
- The monsters under the bed.
- Hunters.
- Archie, Liō's psychopathic ventriloquist's dummy.
- Liō's grandmom.

== Style ==
While it may seem that all the strips are from Liō's imagination, Tatulli has stated that all events in the strip actually happen to Liō. (However, on the back cover of an AMP! Kids Liō book, Liō: There's a Monster in My Socks, they say all the monsters and robots are from his imagination), Most of the time, others turn a blind eye to it, unlike the other-worldly situations in Calvin and Hobbes.

Another notable aspect of Liō (reminiscent of such strips as The Little King, Henry and Ferd'nand) is its general lack of dialogue, though there are occasional vocalizations (such as "Eeck!" or "Aggh!") and there are labels on certain objects to make the gags more obvious. One-time characters have sometimes spoken, and characters in some of the parodies have had dialogue even when Liō himself is silent.

Tatulli has credited Gahan Wilson, Charles Addams and U.S. Civil War era caricaturist Adalbert J. Volck as influences on the visual style of Liō.

== In other media ==
As of October 23, 2007, the strip had been optioned for a live-action feature film by producer David Kirschner.

== Collections ==
Liō strips were collected in seven volumes from August 2007 to May 2013. One omnibus volume, containing the strips from the first two collections, was released in August 2009. Since the release of Liō: Making Friends in 2013, no other print or electronic collections of the daily strip have been released.

Title	Publication Date	ISBN	Contents
Happiness Is a Squishy Cephalopod	August 1, 2007	ISBN 978-0-7407-6849-1	Strips from 2006, including a foreword by Stephan Pastis of Pearls Before Swine.
Silent but Deadly: Another Liō Collection	August 1, 2008	ISBN 978-0-7407-7742-4	Strips from 2007, including a foreword by Wiley Miller of Non Sequitur
Liō's Astonishing Tales: From the Haunted Crypt of Unknown Horrors	August 18, 2009	ISBN 978-0-7407-8541-2	Treasury volume containing the contents of the first two collections, along with some author/artist commentary and a small amount of new material. Includes the origins of Liō.
There's Corpses Everywhere: Yet Another Liō Collection	August 10, 2010	ISBN 978-0-7407-9733-0	Strips from 2008. Title and cover are an obvious parody of a Calvin and Hobbes book.
Reheated Liō: A Delicious Liō Collection Ready to Devour	October 11, 2011	ISBN 978-1-4494-0794-0	Strips from 2009.
Zombies Need Love Too: And Still Another Lio Collection	May 1, 2012	ISBN 978-1-4494-1020-9	Strips from 2010.
Liō: There's a Monster in My Socks	October 2, 2012	ISBN 978-1-4494-2304-9	Strips from 2011.
Liō: Making Friends	May 14, 2013	ISBN 978-1-4494-2558-6	Strips from 2012.

== See also ==
- The Addams Family, a single-panel series of illustrations with imaginative dark humor
- Ed Grimley, a live-action and cartoon character, with a similar front spike hair style
