= Tiny Sepuku =

Comic strip

- Author(s): Ken Cursoe
- Website: www.tinysepuku.com
- Current status/schedule: Current weekly strip
- Launch date: 1997; 28 years ago
- Syndicate(s): Universal Press Syndicate/Universal Uclick/Andrews McMeel Syndication (2003-present)
- Genre(s): Humor

Tiny Sepuku is a syndicated weekly comic strip created by Ken Cursoe based around a character named Tiny Sepuku (usually addressed simply as "Tiny" by readers - every question starts with the salutation "Dear Tiny") who answers questions from his readers and generally dispenses love advice.

== Publication history ==
Tiny Sepuku began in 1997 as a parody of Hello Kitty, and achieved success in alternative weeklies by the year 2000. Tiny Sepuku has been distributed by Universal Press Syndicate/Universal Uclick/Andrews McMeel Syndication since April 3, 2003.

== Background ==
The humor is occasionally self-parodying where the author may make light of his own experiences, and it is frequently cynical on the topic of love. Nevertheless, the comic occasionally dispenses semi-serious advice and explores relationship issues. Among the recurring cast of characters is a cat resembling the Hello Kitty character, along with a bunch of other drawings which frequently act out the adult situations in the letters. One common technique used in the strip is to suggest a variety of possible reactions and ways to deal with a situation, and have the characters act out each one.
