= Tom Toles =

Retired American political cartoonist

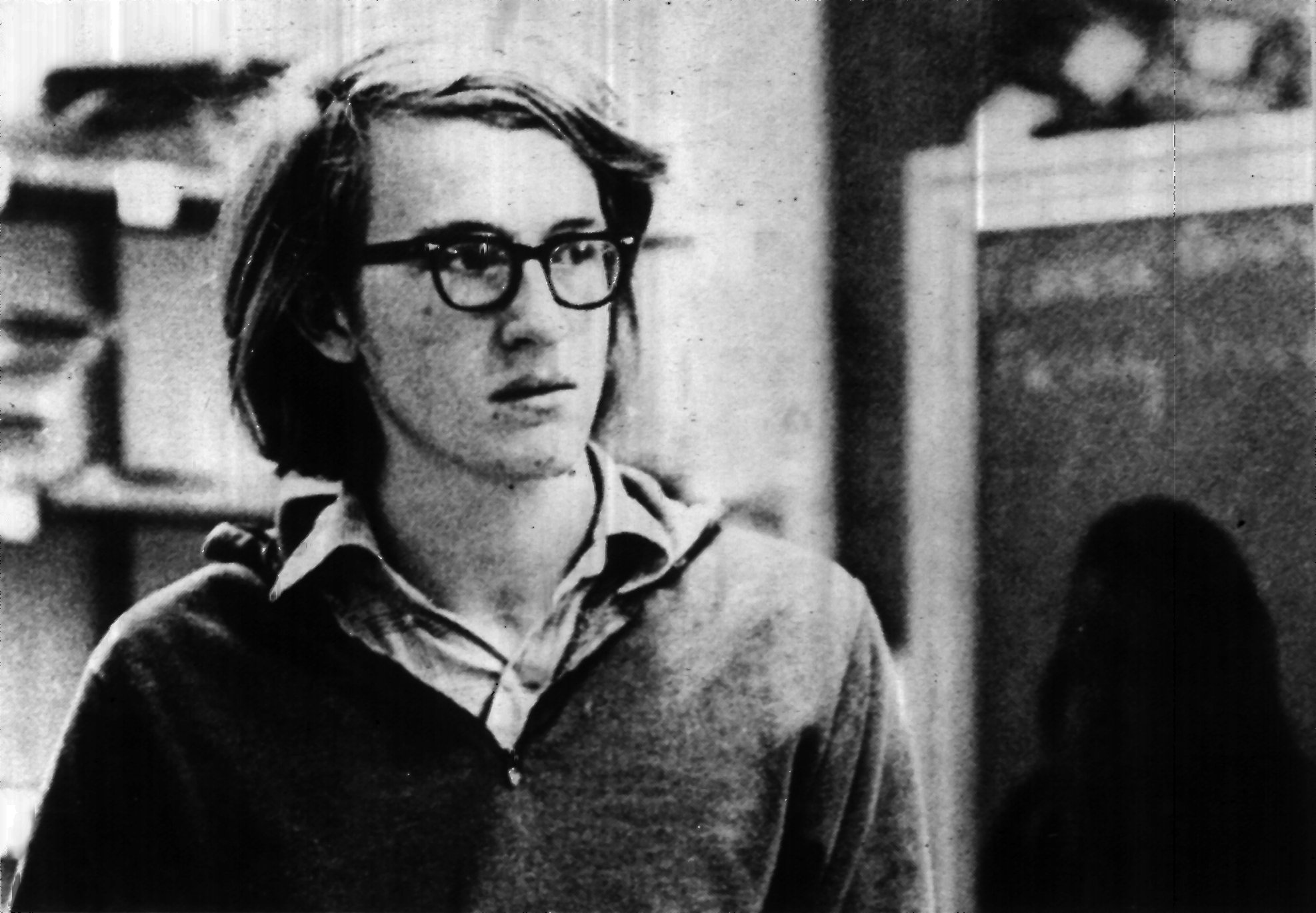
- Toles at the University at Buffalo's student newspaper, The Spectrum (1970)
- Born: Thomas Gregory Toles; October 22, 1951 (age 75) Buffalo, New York, U.S.
- Area: cartoonist
- Notable works: Editorial cartoons

Thomas Gregory Toles (born October 22, 1951) is a retired American political cartoonist. He is the winner of the 1990 Pulitzer Prize for editorial cartooning. His cartoons typically presented progressive viewpoints. Similar to Oliphant's use of his character Punk, Toles also tended to include a small doodle, usually a small caricature of himself at his desk, in the margin of his strip.

== Biography ==
Toles wrote for The Buffalo Courier-Express, The Buffalo News and The Washington Post. He left The Buffalo News in 2002, accepting an offer from The Washington Post to replace their cartoonist Herblock, and is under contract by Universal Press Syndicate. Part of his acceptance of his new job required him to give up his United Feature-distributed daily and Sunday cartoon panel Randolph Itch 2 AM, a cartoon based on Toles' thoughts while battling insomnia. Toles was replaced at the Buffalo News by Adam Zyglis. In addition to Randolph Itch 2 AM, Toles also created a daily and Sunday comic strip about small children called Curious Avenue. It ran 1992-1994 through his future editorial cartooning syndicate, Universal Press Syndicate. A collection of the strip was published in 1993 through the publisher Andrews McMeel Publishing.

Toles' cartoons appeared in more than 200 newspapers throughout the country. He received the National Cartoonist Society Editorial Cartoon Award for 2003 and the Herblock Prize for 2011.

In 2016, he co-authored with Michael E. Mann The Madhouse Effect, describing the global warming controversy.

On October 30, 2020, Toles retired from political cartooning after serving 18 years as a Washington Post political cartoonist. In his last political cartoon of his career, titled Tom Toles’s final cartoon, he advocated for voting against Donald Trump in the 2020 United States presidential election, warned about climate change and the disruptive power of artificial intelligence.

== Personal life ==
Toles graduated magna cum laude from the University at Buffalo, The State University of New York. He married Gretchen Saarnijoki in 1973; together they have two children, Amanda and Seth.

In 2008, Toles began performing with the rock band Suspicious Package at venues around Washington, D.C. The band consists of Toles on drums, former HUD senior official Bryan Greene on guitar, Josh Meyer of the L.A. Times on lead guitar, Tim Burger of Bloomberg News on bass, and Office of the U.S. Trade Representative senior official Christina Sevilla on keyboard. The band debuted May 30, 2008 at The Red and the Black in Northeast D.C. Toles endorsed Democratic candidate Hillary Clinton in the run-up for the 2016 U.S. presidential election.

== Pulitzer Prize ==
Toles was awarded the Pulitzer Prize in editorial cartooning in 1990. He was one of two finalists for the prize in 1985, and was one of three finalists for the prize in 1996.

== Controversy ==
A cartoon published January 29, 2006 attracted the ire of the Pentagon in the form of a protest letter signed by the Joint Chiefs of Staff. With regard to some recent assessments of the United States Army, the cartoon depicted the Army as a quadruple amputee soldier with a doctor resembling Secretary of Defense Donald Rumsfeld, declaring the Army "battle hardened". The Joint Chiefs of Staff stated, "Using the likeness of a service member who has lost his arms and legs in war as the central theme of a cartoon [is] beyond tasteless." Toles was quoted responding, "I think it's a little bit unfair in their reading of the cartoon to imply that is what it's about." On February 7, 2006 Tom Tomorrow published a cartoon comparing the reactions to the Muhammad cartoons to the Tom Toles cartoons, alleging a double standard.

== Other appearances ==
In March 2010, Toles appeared in the twelfth episode of The Real World: Washington, DC, in which cast member Andrew Woods, an aspiring cartoonist, met with him at The Washington Post to seek career advice.
