= Universal Press Syndicate =

Defunct independent press syndicate

- Company type: Syndication
- Industry: Media
- Founded: 1970; 56 years ago
- Founders: John McMeel; Jim Andrews
- Defunct: 2009; 17 years ago
- Fate: Merged with Uclick
- Successor: Andrews McMeel Syndication
- Headquarters: Kansas City, Missouri, United States
- Services: lifestyle and opinion columns, comic strips
- Owner: Universal Uclick
- Parent: Andrews McMeel Universal
- Divisions: (international) Atlantic Syndication

Universal Press Syndicate (UPS), a subsidiary of Andrews McMeel Universal, was an independent American press syndicate. It distributed lifestyle and opinion columns, comic strips and other content. Popular columns include Dear Abby, Ann Coulter, Roger Ebert and News of the Weird. Founded in 1970, it was merged in July 2009 with Uclick (which published its comics on GoComics) to form Universal Uclick (now known as Andrews McMeel Syndication).

== History ==
=== 20th century ===
Universal Press Syndicate was founded by John McMeel and Jim Andrews in 1970, two graduates of the University of Notre Dame. Their early syndication success came as a result of Andrews reading the Yale Daily News. While clipping a column by a priest, he was distracted by Garry Trudeau's Bull Tales comic strip on the facing page. When Trudeau's Doonesbury debuted as a daily strip in two dozen newspapers on October 26, 1970, it was the first strip from Universal Press Syndicate, and a Sunday strip was launched March 21, 1971. Circulation of Doonesbury eventually expanded to more than 1,400 newspapers internationally.

Strips like Ziggy (launched 1971), Kelly & Duke, (launched 1972), Tank McNamara (launched 1974), Cathy (launched 1976), and For Better or For Worse (launched 1979) soon followed, and UPS took off.

UPS established Andrews McMeel Publishing in 1973.

In the spring of 1979, Universal Press acquired the existing columns and strips of the Washington Star Syndicate from Time Inc., which had acquired the Star Syndicate in early 1978. As part of the deal, Time Inc. took on a 20% ownership of Universal Press Syndicate; that was later bought back.

At first, ownership of the comic strips was in the hands of both the artist and the syndicate, but beginning in 1990, UPS gave comic strip creators full rights to their respective works. The company also instituted a policy that says any cartoonist who has been with them for five years or more receives four weeks a year of vacation.

In 1996, UPS established Universal New Media to sell digital entertainment content.

In 1997, UPS acquired Chronicle Features, the syndication arm of the San Francisco Chronicle. (It had previously acquired notable Chronicle Features strips The Far Side, Bizarro, and the editorial cartoons of Ted Rall).

Universal New Media was renamed Uclick in 1997. Also in 1997, Jim Andrews and John McMeel formed Andrews McMeel Universal (AMU) to reflect the diversification that had taken place since its founding. Universal Press Syndicate became one of AMU's subdivisions (along with Uclick and Andrews McMeel Publishing).

=== 21st century ===
In 2004, UPS acquired the international syndicate Editors Press Service (founded in 1933) from the Evening Post Publishing Company and renamed it Atlantic Syndication.

In July 2009, UPS merged with Andrews McMeel's digital entertainment company Uclick to form Universal Uclick.

== Some syndicated works ==
=== Comic strips (selected) ===
UPS strips as of the July 2009 merger into Universal Uclick:

- Adam@home
- Argyle Sweater
- Baldo
- Biographic
- Cathy
- Close to Home
- Compu-toon
- Cornered
- Cul de Sac
- Doonesbury
- The Duplex
- The 5th Wave
- FoxTrot
- Fred Basset
- The Fusco Brothers
- Garfield — acquired from United Feature Syndicate in 1993 (launched 1978)
- Heart of the City
- In the Bleachers
- Ink Pen
- La Cucaracha
- Liō
- Maintaining
- Non Sequitur
- Off the Mark
- Overboard
- Pearls Before Swine
- Pooch Café
- Real Life Adventures
- Red and Rover
- Stone Soup
- Tank McNamara
- Tiny Sepuku
- Tom the Dancing Bug
- W. T. Duck
- You Can with Beakman and Jax
- Ziggy

Concluded UPS strips as of July 2009:

- Bizarro (1995–2003) — acquired from Chronicle Features, where it launched in 1985; moved to King Features Syndicate in 2003, where it continues to the present
- The Boondocks (1999–2006)
- Calvin and Hobbes (1985–1995)
- Citizen Dog (1995–2001)
- Cleats (2001–2010)
- Downstown (1974–1986)
- Encyclopedia Brown (1978–1980)
- The Far Side (1985–1995) — acquired from Chronicle Features, where it launched in 1980
- For Better or For Worse (1979–1997, 2004–2008) — moved to United Feature Syndicate from 1997 to 2004
- Geech (1982–2000) — moved to United Feature Syndicate, where it lasted until 2003
- Kelly & Duke (1974–1980)
- Kudzu (1981–2007)
- Lucky Cow (2003–2008)
- Mullets (2003–2005)
- PreTeena (2001–2008)
- Where I'm Coming From (1991–2005)

=== Editorial cartoonists ===
- Bad Reporter by Don Asmussen
- Matt Davies
- Glenn McCoy
- Pat Oliphant
- Ted Rall
- Ben Sargent
- Tom Toles

=== Columns and columnists ===
UPS columns and columnists include:

- Dear Abby
- Ann Coulter
- Roger Ebert
- Focus on the Family
- The Last Word in Astrology
- The Needleworks by Nancy Thomas
- News of the Weird
- Tell Me a Story
- The Vid Kid by Rawson Stovall

=== Puzzles and games ===
- Timothy Parker
