= FoxTrot =

American comic strip created by Bill Amend

- Author: Bill Amend
- Website: https://www.foxtrot.com
- Current status/schedule: Sundays-only; daily until December 30, 2006
- Launch date: April 10, 1988; 38 years ago
- Syndicate: Universal Press Syndicate/Universal Uclick/Andrews McMeel Syndication
- Publisher: Andrews McMeel Publishing
- Genre(s): Humor, Family, Pop Culture

FoxTrot is an American comic strip written and illustrated by Bill Amend. The strip launched on April 10, 1988, and it originally ran seven days a week. From December 31, 2006 onwards, FoxTrot has only appeared on Sundays.

The strip revolves around the daily lives of the Fox family, composed of parents Andrea (Andy) and Roger and their children, Peter, Paige, and Jason. It covers a wide range of subject matter, including spoofs of pop culture fads, nerd culture, complex math, and popular consumer products.

== Publication history ==
Cartoonist Bill Amend states that after he submitted strips for three years, in 1987 Universal Press Syndicate (UPS) offered him a contract. FoxTrot was first syndicated by UPS on April 10, 1988.

On December 5, 2006, Universal Press Syndicate issued a press release stating that Amend's strip, FoxTrot, would turn into a Sunday-only strip and the comic confirming it was on December 25, 2006, just 20 days later. Amend stated that he wanted to continue doing the strip, but at a less hurried pace. This news was followed by a week-long arc of the characters discussing a "cartoonist" semi-retiring to Sundays only, and what methods he would use to phase out the daily strips. The last daily strip was shown on December 30, 2006. At the end of its run as a daily comic, FoxTrot was carried by more than 1,200 newspapers worldwide. Since moving to one comic every week, Amend has said that it's harder to remain topical because Sunday's deadline is 30 days ahead of publication, compared with just 10-day deadlines the rest of the week. Amend and fellow cartoonist Stephan Pastis joked that Amend switched to a Sundays-only schedule "so he could spend 18 hours a day playing World of Warcraft."

== Characters and story ==
FoxTrot takes place with the daily lives of the Foxes, a suburban family, composed of father Roger, mother Andrea (Andy), and their children: Peter (age 16), Paige (14), and Jason (10), who live together. The Fox family lives in a suburban setting. Amend has said he has never specified where the Foxes live, and he has shown them taking vacations to the desert and various amusement parks and campgrounds.

Amend majored in physics at Amherst College, and his knowledge on the subject is reflected in FoxTrot's frequent inclusion of complex mathematical or physics formulae, usually written by Jason, whom Amend described as "largely an exaggerated representation of [his] own geeky nature." Jason is also used to express Amend's knowledge of computer languages.

Recurring characters include Jason's pet iguana Quincy; Jason's friend Marcus and his classmate Eileen Jacobson; Paige's friend Nicole and her classmate Morton Goldthwait; Peter's blind girlfriend, Denise, and his friend Steve; and other friends and classmates of the children and Roger's co-workers. Like many comic strips, FoxTrot employs a floating timeline "for specific reasons and to create specific dynamics between [Peter, Paige, and Jason]."

== Books ==
The strips have been printed in 45 different books, all by Andrews McMeel Publishing. Of the 45 books, 31 are collections and 14 are anthologies. The anthologies are composed of the two or three previous collections and include Sunday strips in color.

=== Merchandising ===
During the late 1990s, the character of Jason Fox was licensed to Wolfram Research as a product mascot for its Mathematica software package.
