= Cornered (comics) =

Comic strip by Mike Baldwin

- Author(s): Mike Baldwin
- Website: www.gocomics.com/cornered
- Current status/schedule: Running daily & Sunday gag panel
- Launch date: April 1, 1996; 28 years ago
- Syndicate(s): Universal Press Syndicate/Universal Uclick/Andrews McMeel Syndication
- Publisher(s): Andrews McMeel Publishing
- Genre(s): Humor

Cornered is a single-panel comic strip by Mike Baldwin. It was launched on April 1, 1996, and is distributed through Andrews McMeel Syndication. On dailies, Cornered usually has characters' dialogue below the panel, whereas on Sundays the characters' dialogue is often in speaking bubbles. Everybody, including animals, wears glasses.
