= Overboard (comic strip) =

American comic strip by Chip Dunham

- Author: Chip Dunham
- Website: www.gocomics.com/overboard
- Current status/schedule: Current daily strip
- Launch date: July 1990; 36 years ago
- Syndicate(s): United Feature Syndicate/Universal Uclick/Andrews McMeel Syndication
- Genre(s): Humor, Pirates

Overboard is Chip Dunham's daily newspaper comic strip about a shipload of incompetent pirates. It debuted in July 1990 and is distributed by Andrews McMeel Syndication.

== The strip ==
Overboard derives much of its humor from having its characters anachronistically placed in modern times. For instance, they put quarters in dockside parking meters, order pizza by cellphone, and have a company health insurance plan.

These pirates are much less fearsome than their ruthless predecessors. In the early years of the strip, much of their activity involved standing around on deck drinking coffee and reading the newspaper. Recent strips feature golf, pet care and gardening. Their enemy is the Green Ship and its rival band of pirates, but giant rabbits attacking the garden, sharks, octopuses, and the Internal Revenue Service also are threats.

Competence is also an issue. While the Overboard crew carries cutlasses and makes raids, most often their treasure is stolen by disgruntled shipmates or by more able pirates. The captain has made a horrendous mess of the investments for their pension fund (at one point, he adjusts his failed investment strategy by flushing cash straight down the toilet).

The pirates actively pursue dates with women but instead repulse them with poor hygiene, fleas, disgusting table manners, immaturity, cheapness, and a lack of interest in the arts. The captain impresses women and other outsiders with his incredibly boring personality (in one strip, the captain's psychiatrist dies of boredom during a therapy session). Despite occasional friendships with women, it appears that none of the pirates has ever had an official girlfriend, other than the captain who has had a mermaid girlfriend.

== Cast ==
The main characters are:

- Captain Henry Crow - the bland skipper of their ship, the "Revenge". Crow seems a little smarter and more sophisticated than the crew, but he is far too decent to be a successful pirate, even if he were otherwise capable. Regularly participates in large battles but, reacts to duels with cowardice.
- Charley Duff - along with Crow's other crew members, the diminutive Charley was originally portrayed as lying, lazy, stupid, selfish, and childlike. Yet, like the others, he was the best Crow could do, owing to recruitment woes such as scurvy. In recent years, Charley has been more productive and responsible, perhaps for two reasons. Several years ago, Charley attempted to reform his character so as to win the affection of Marlene. Though he failed in his goal, the changes seem permanent. Also, Charley has become a conscientious pet owner, which has mitigated his selfishness, it seems. Perhaps all this makes it not too surprising that Charley has become an ardent if hapless gardener.
- Nate - crew member who at first glance looks most like a pirate: hulking, fearsome, with a massive and impenetrable black beard. Despite some rough ways and bad hygiene, Nate is a gentle giant who often acts with honor and respect toward others, especially women and children. Nate and the captain often conspire to keep Charley out of trouble.
- Louie - Captain Crow's pet dog. Unlike every other regular animal character in the strip, Louie doesn't speak but rather projects thought balloons, in the manner of Snoopy or Garfield. Other animals, but not humans, can understand these and be understood by Louie. Louie is extremely spoiled, always helping himself to human luxuries such as beds and steaks. He seems to have a better lifestyle than the subordinate pirates and usually gets his way. He is a yellow Labrador Retriever, as mentioned in the strip repeatedly, and many of Louie's behaviours are considered stereotypical of the breed. His birthday is September 14; in 2019 the celebration involved a series of toppled trash cans full of goodies.
- The Green Pirates - a gang of rival pirates from another ship, they are always around to start a fight or to steal their treasure. While more ruthless than Crow's crew, the Green Pirates have not generally proven to be much smarter or more competent.
- Guy with clover in hat - one of the pirates from the Green Ship. Has been seen to be nice to Louie, unlike most of the Green Ship pirates. This led to Louie asking the cartoonist to make sure he doesn't get hurt in one of the strips.
- Cecilia - a female pirate from the Green Ship, she made a covert attempt to seduce Captain Crow and raid his ship. When her cover was blown, she became a regular aboard Crow's ship; he encouraged her visits because he remained in love with her, despite her duplicity. Cecilia became friends with Crow and no longer posed any threat, though she never came to love him. This storyline lasted several months and Cecilia stayed in the strip for a long time after her plot was exposed. It seemed that she had become a regular character, but Cecilia silently disappeared from the strip sometime in 2003, though her dog Raymond remains. (During Cecilia's storyline, it was stated that she was captain of the Green Ship, but she was not seen before or after. In the strip for January 3, 2007, Crow states that he and the Green Ship captain became enemies in high school. The Green Ship captain is shown to be a man.)
- Raymond - another dog. Unlike Louie, Raymond walks on two legs, wears a hat, smokes cigarettes, and talks directly to humans. He can also understand Louie's thought balloons, however, and still retains many dog-like characteristics such as a love of eating garbage and carrion. Raymond was originally depicted as belonging to the villainous Cecilia and serving as a henchman in her schemes against Crow's crew, but like Cecilia he gradually became friends with Crow and continued as a regular even after Cecilia's departure from the cast.
- The cartoonist - often appears at his drawing table with a sign saying "Overboard, Inc." Whenever Charley comes into his office asking for a raise, he draws a sea monster to eat him.
- Janey - a mermaid that Crow has developed a friendship with (and romantic feelings for). However, she and Crow both acknowledge the difficulties posed by their differences, such as Janey's preference for worms as pizza topping.
- The sea monster - a giant Godzilla-like creature that shows up now and then to terrorize Crow's ship. Not to be confused with the tentacle that is usually drawn in as a practical joke by the cartoonist. In the March 22, 2008 strip, it is revealed that his name is "Gork" and that he is in love with Janey the mermaid.
- Scratch the Green Ship's cat. Scratch wants very much to eat the mice. He originally lived on the Green Ship, but his owner became violently allergic to him and asked Captain Crow to take him in.
- The mice - normal-sized but talking mice that live on the ship. A female mouse, Ellie, has unrequited romantic feelings for Captain Crow, much to the annoyance of her boyfriend, Jonas. At first, none of the human crew could understand the mice, hearing only squeaks or very tiny voices; generally leaving the translations to Raymond. Over time, the humans began to understand the mice without any difficulty, leaving Louie the animal that can't speak aloud. Recently, the mice have taken on more and more human like quality, including a recent strip showing a large quantity of mouse holes for sale as a result of foreclosure, as well as the mice playing human sports, like hockey (albeit, with miniature equipment, played on the ship's kiddie pool, filled with frozen water.) The mice have also taken to driving tiny cars around the ship; which has resulted in them incurring traffic violations, largely due to them ramming into one of the human crew (generally Crow, who in one strip, revealed his foot was in a cast as a result of such a crash). The traffic violations have in turn resulted in Crow acting as jailer for some of the mice, as they pay their "debt to society". The mice fly miniature fighter aircraft which they use to fly to the Green Ship and attack Scratch.
- The rabbits - large, anthropomorphic talking rabbits who frequently sneak onto the ship at night to steal from Charley's vegetable garden.
- Seahawk - originally depicted as Crow's second in command, Seahawk has not been seen in the strip in recent years.
- Boof - a wimpy pirate, often a target of Charley and Seahawk. Not seen in recent years.
- Marlene - a woman who once served as a love interest for Charley. Not seen in recent years.
- The crow's nest pirates - A pair of unnamed pirates who occupied the crow's nest of the "Revenge". Not seen in recent years.
