= PreTeena =

American comic strip by Allison Barrows

- Author: Allison Barrows
- Website: www.gocomics.com/preteena
- Current status/schedule: Concluded daily strip
- Launch date: April 23, 2001
- End date: May 18, 2008
- Syndicate(s): Universal Press Syndicate
- Genre: Humor

PreTeena, sometimes spelled Preteena, was a daily American comic strip written and drawn by Allison Barrows and syndicated by Universal Press Syndicate from April 23, 2001, through May 18, 2008 for seven years. It concerned the daily life of 10-year-old girl Teena Keene, and her interactions with her family, friends, and teachers. Although Teena was the main character, centers often switched for days at a time to the supporting cast.

Teena frequently played the role of the straight man in the strip's humor, seeming down-to-earth compared to the odd characters around her, in particular her weird best friend Shtick and ditzy sister Jeri. In many strips, Teena narrowed her eyes and placed increasing emphasis on her sarcasm, only to have her meaning lost on the other party. Teena's identity as the apparently only sane person in an crazy world was underlined by her red hair, a distinctive physical trait that set her apart from the others. Promotional materials from Universal Press Syndicate position the strip for its appeal to the tween-aimed market, stating in part the portrayal of a pre-adolescent as the most sensible character.

Professional cartoonist Barrows based the strip on her unused concept for a children's book. She named the Keene family after her adoptive hometown of Keene, New Hampshire. Her artistic style varies in dissimilar perspectives, such as giving her characters circular eyes in close-up, but mere dots when drawn at a distance.

The strip ended its run in May 2008 following a sequence in which Teena relates a dream to Shtick where the primary characters have grown up; Shtick is now a fashion model. Jeri is the best-selling author of the fictional book Your Life is Worth Something (Even Though You're Not Me). Johnson is a hunky movie star who now has a production company and is directing his first film. Goose has invented sophisticated spy technology that can also be used as X-ray specs. And Gordo and Teena, after dating in college, are married and live in a small town with their two children.

== Characters ==
=== Main ===
- Teena Keene - A sensible and intelligent, if-excitable, pre-adolescent girl, Teena is the central character in the strip. She is in the fifth grade at her local elementary school and a gifted math student, with a habit of wearing down her teachers by asking too many enthusiastic questions. Her hobbies include inline skating, playing with dolls or in the snow (during winter), and inventing elaborate personas with her frequent playmate Stick. She has shown an interest in journalism as a possible adult career, and can also speak in a Lithuanian language.
- Sabra Naomi "Stick" Klein - Teena's best friend, given her nickname because of her waifish figure. She is almost always unkempt and malnourished, having to take many vitamins and prescription medications, and is afflicted with everything from hay fever to myopia to asthma. A stereotypical dork with faith, adding her glasses and braces, Stick is a social pariah without any other friends and talks to herself. Though she is occasionally too weird for Teena, their friendship is based on mutual affection and the fact that Stick is sometimes the only person who understands Teena. Stick's father is the Keenes' dentist.
- Jeri Keene - Corrupted by teendom and almost always appearing with excessive makeup and jewelry, Teena's older sister represents what Teena could eventually become. Obsessed with boys, fashion, and shopping, 14-year-old Jeri regards Teena's youthful innocence with disdain, and the two frequently bicker over household habits such as bathroom access. Jeri regards Stick with unconcealed disdain. She is portrayed as a stereotypical dumb blonde, the character most often oblivious to Teena's sarcastic barbs. She is also lazy, preferring to sleep in until noon on weekends and arguing often with her mother about the messy state of her bedroom. She dated former geek Johnson Pinecone.

=== Supporting ===
- Tess Keene - Teena and Jeri's mother. She is a children's book illustrator. She had a birthday on September 14th, 2007.
- Hugh Keene - Teena and Jeri's father is a fine artist and illustrator like his wife. Tess and Hugh are very close, have a strong marriage, and are close to their girls, but not intimidated by them. They are savvy professionals and view their children - and the world - with amused irony.
- Gordon "Gordo" Brandt - A good friend and classmate of Teena. One occasionally demonstrates romantic affection for the other, only to make a show of withdrawing and professing the innocence of their friendship. Like Teena, he is athletic and music-loving: his mother is a music teacher and his father owns a music shop. His family makes frequent appearances in the strip, including his fashionable older brother Guy and baby sister Marley (named after a Caribbean performer).
- Johnson Pinecone - The Keenes' teenaged neighbor, for years Johnson was too shy to admit his feelings for Jeri, who made no secret of regarding him as a social outcast. Her demeanor gradually softened in a series of stories, including when they worked together on her grandmother's farm and she discovered his muscular physique, and he finally tricked her into falling for him by starting a rumor that they were going to a school dance together.

== Quotations ==
- Tess Keene, after Teena has calculated how to get an extra week out of summer vacation by getting up early and staying up late: "Why couldn't you hate math, like normal children?"
- Teena, writing in her journal: September 15th. High noon. The air is thick with tension. The skin is electric. Anticipation gives way to anxiety. We wait. With dread, we wait. Stick, holding a bowl: "Yup. Dessert is lime jello with sliced bananas." Teena, hanging her head: The shock is too great for this journalist to continue.
- Teena's teacher: "Class, we're going on a field trip tomorrow. Whose parents can drive?" Teena, holding up her hand: "Are you asking for an opinion?" Later, Teena to her mother: "You're off the hook."

== Book ==
Title	Publication Date	ISBN	Publisher
PreTeena: The Paperback	2007	none	Universal Press Syndicate. Only available through Lulu.com
