= Dark Side of the Horse =

Finnish comic strip

Dark Side of the Horse (Finnish: Musta hevonen, "the black horse") is a Finnish comic strip, written and drawn by the comics artist Samuli Lintula under the pen name Samson starting in 2008. The strip features the horses Horace (Heikki, a steed) and Melody (Helka, a mare), and the bird Sine (Sini). In North America, the strip is syndicated by Andrews McMeel Syndication.
