= Matt Davies (cartoonist) =

American cartoonist (born 1966)

- Born: 1966 (age 59–60); London
- Education: Savannah College of Art & Design in Savannah, Georgia
- Occupations: Political cartoonist, children's author
- Website: mattdaviescartoon.com

Matt Davies (born 1966) is a British-American Pulitzer Prize-winning editorial cartoonist, and author and illustrator of children's books.

== Biography ==
Davies was born in London in 1966 and lived there until his family relocated to the United States in 1983.

He graduated from Staples High School in Westport, Connecticut, in 1985, and subsequently studied illustration and fine art at The Savannah College of Art & Design in Savannah, Georgia, then the School of Visual Arts in New York City. After college, he began doing freelance cartoons, before being hired full-time to draw for The Journal News (based in Westchester, New York) in April 1993.

He joined Newsday as staff cartoonist and a member of the editorial board in 2014 in New York, and his cartoons are syndicated nationally by Universal Uclick.

In the past Davies has drawn for The Journal News in Westchester, New York, the Hearst Connecticut Newspaper group, and the non-profit online policy journal Remapping Debate.org.

His work has appeared regularly in The New York Times, The Washington Post, the Los Angeles Times and USA Today. His work has also been featured in Newsweek, Time, U.S. News & World Report, CNN, The Week and Mad Magazine.

In 2004–2005 he was the President of the Association of American Editorial Cartoonists.

Along with penning political cartoons, Davies is an author and illustrator of children's picture books. He is represented by Rodeen Literary Agency and was signed with Neal Porter, of Roaring Brook Press/Macmillan to write and illustrate his first two picture books. The first book titled Ben Rides On was released to wide critical acclaim in the spring of 2013, was a Junior Library Guild selection for fall 2013 and a Kirkus Reviews "Best Book" of 2013. His second book Ben Draws Trouble was released in 2015. He also illustrated the children's picture books Nerdy Birdy (2016) and Nerdy Birdy Tweets (2017), written by New York Times bestselling author Aaron Reynolds.

Davies has given talks about cartooning and politics at many venues including the UN, The Library of Congress, The National Press Club in Washington DC, Columbia University, The British Library in London, The National Archives in Washington, D.C., and the Tribeca Film Festival. He was also the 2004 Writer-in-Residence with the Journalism and Art departments at the University of Wisconsin-Madison, and served on the advisory board of the National Cartoon Museum.

Davies and his wife, Lucy, live in New York with their three children.

== Awards ==
- 2004 Pulitzer Prize for Editorial Cartooning
- 2004 Herblock Prize
- 2001 Robert F. Kennedy Journalism Award for cartooning
- 2011 Pulitzer Prize Finalist
- 2016 Pulitzer Prize Finalist
- 2017 Headliners Award
- 2019 Herblock Prize
- five-time winner of the Deadline Club Award from the New York City Chapter of the Society of Professional Journalists
- five first-prize awards from New York Associated Press Editorial Cartooning Competition.

== Works ==
- "Are We Witnessing the Dusk of a Cartooning Era?", Nieman Reports
- "Cartoonists Reach Out to Educators", Nieman Reports
