= Andrews McMeel Syndication =

American content syndicate

- Formerly: Universal Uclick (2009–2017)
- Type: Print syndication and web syndication
- Predecessor: Universal Press Syndicate; Uclick
- Founded: September 2009; 17 years ago
- Founders: Jim Andrews and John McMeel
- Headquarters: Kansas City, Missouri, United States
- Key people: Brent Bartram, chief strategy officer and general manager
- Services: Lifestyle & opinion columns, comic strips, cartoons
- Parent: Andrews McMeel Universal
- Subsidiaries: United Feature Syndicate; Newspaper Enterprise Association
- Website: Official website

Andrews McMeel Syndication (formerly Universal Uclick) is an American content syndicate which provides syndication in print, online and on mobile devices for a number of lifestyle and opinion columns, comic strips, cartoons, and various other content. Some of its best-known products include Dear Abby, Doonesbury, Ziggy, Garfield, Ann Coulter, Richard Roeper and News of the Weird. A subsidiary of Andrews McMeel Universal, it is headquartered in Kansas City, Missouri. It was formed in 2009 and renamed in 2017.

== History ==
Universal Press Syndicate (UPS) was founded in 1970 by Jim Andrews and John McMeel. The company began syndicating Garry Trudeau's Doonesbury comic strip in October 1970. Trudeau won the Pulitzer Prize for editorial cartooning in 1975 for his work on Doonesbury. The strip as of 2009 was syndicated in more than 1,400 newspapers worldwide. Over decades, the syndicate added other well-known comic strips including Ziggy, Cathy, For Better or For Worse, Calvin and Hobbes, The Far Side, FoxTrot, Baldo, The Boondocks, In the Bleachers, Non Sequitur, Stone Soup, Real Life Adventures, Cornered, Liō, Cul De Sac, Thatababy, Wumo, editorial cartoonists and columnists.

Universal Uclick was formed in July 2009 following the merger of Universal Press Syndicate with Andrews McMeel's digital entertainment company Uclick.

In 2011, Dilbert moved from United Feature Syndicate to Universal Uclick in June. Dilbert was with Universal Uclick/Andrews McMeel Syndication until they severed their relationship with Adams in 2023. Several newspapers have chosen to replace Dilbert with a new comic strip Crabgrass by Tauhid Bondia which was introduced in 2022.

In February 2011, Universal Uclick signed a deal with E. W. Scripps Company's United Media to handle syndication of the latter company's 150 comic strip and news features (under the banners United Feature Syndicate and the Newspaper Enterprise Association) beginning on June 1 of that year. The United Media deal brought over such long-running comic strips as Alley Oop, Marmaduke, Nancy, and Tarzan.

As a result of this acquisition, Universal Uclick became one of the largest print syndicators in the United States, as United Media — along with King Features Syndicate and Creators Syndicate — was one of Andrews McMeel's main competitors in the industry.

== Comic strips and panels ==
Existing and formerly syndicated comics by Andrews McMeel Syndication include Dilbert (until February 2023), For Better or For Worse, FoxTrot, Calvin and Hobbes, Garfield, The Boondocks, Doonesbury, Cathy, Pooch Café, Baldo, What the Duck, Ink Pen, Liō, Cul de Sac, Ziggy, Tom the Dancing Bug, Ozy and Millie, The Far Side and Peanuts (since February 2011) in newspapers, calendars and books.

Andrews McMeel Syndication also owns and operates GoComics (launched in 2005), a comics aggregate website featuring comic strips syndicated in print, online and on mobile devices by Andrews McMeel Syndication, as well as discontinued titles such as Calvin and Hobbes, The Boondocks and Bloom County, webcomics such as Pibgorn and Kliban, plus a selection of syndicated comic strips from Creators Syndicate and Tribune Content Agency.

In October 2008, Uclick launched a GoComics gadget for iGoogle which allows users to read comic strips on their iGoogle pages.

As of 2016, the company syndicated more than 80 comic strips to over 2,000 newspapers worldwide.

== Editorial cartoons ==
Editorial cartoonists carried by Andrews McMeel Syndication include Lalo Alcaraz, Pat Oliphant, Ted Rall, Rob Rogers, Tom Toles, Matt Davies, Matt Bors, and Matt Wuerker.

== Puzzles and games ==
Andrews McMeel Syndication distributes daily puzzles and games in newspapers and other print media. The company also distributes puzzles and casual games online through consumer and news web portals as well as, formerly, through its own puzzle and game portals, PuzzleSociety.com and UclickGames.com (since moved to gocomics.com/puzzles). Andrews McMeel Syndication products include crossword puzzles and games edited by David Steinberg and Pat Sajak, number placement puzzles like Sudoku and Kakuro, jigsaw puzzles and other casual games. Andrews McMeel Syndication distributes the daily Jumble online (but not in print, where Tribune Media Services distributes the puzzles).

== Syndicated columns and text features ==
Andrews McMeel Syndication syndicated columns and text features are distributed in newspapers and other print media worldwide and online through consumer and news web portals, as well as through the Andrews McMeel Syndication syndicated column and text feature consumer site, uExpress.com. Popular Andrews McMeel Syndication columns and text features include the advice columns Dear Abby and Miss Manners, conservative columnist Ann Coulter, film critic Roger Ebert, and News of the Weird.

== Comic books and manga ==
In 2006, Universal Uclick launched the United States' first comic book reader application for mobile phones. The introductory line of titles included Teenage Mutant Ninja Turtles, The Five Fists of Science, Godland, PvP and Too Much Coffee Man. Andrews McMeel Syndication has also published mobile versions and iPhone applications featuring comic book titles from Devil's Due Publishing, Image Comics, IDW Publishing and Jeff Smith's Bone series.

== See also ==
- List of comic strip syndicates
