= Andrews McMeel Publishing =

American publishing company

- Parent company: Andrews McMeel Universal
- Founded: 1975; 51 years ago
- Founder: Jim Andrews and John McMeel
- Country of origin: United States
- Headquarters location: Kansas City, Missouri
- Distribution: Simon & Schuster
- Key people: John P. McMeel (chairman); Hugh T. Andrews (owner); Kirsty E. Melville (CEO, president and publisher, book division)
- Publication types: Books, calendars
- Imprints: Accord
- Official website: publishing.andrewsmcmeel.com

Andrews McMeel Publishing, LLC (formerly Andrews, McMeel and Parker (1975–1986) and Andrews and McMeel (1986–1997) is an American company that publishes books, calendars, and related toys. It is a part of Andrews McMeel Universal, which comprises AMP, Andrews McMeel Syndication, and AMUSE. The name Parker was creative director George Parker; the company dropped "Parker" after his departure.

Andrews McMeel is the general publisher of books of comic strips produced by Andrews McMeel Syndication including Peanuts, The Far Side, Calvin and Hobbes and FoxTrot, but the company also produces book collections for some comic strips which are owned by other syndicates.

== History ==
The publishing country was founded in 1970 by Jim Andrews and John McMeel, and entered the book business with the 1973 acquisition of Sheed and Ward. The publishing arm began in 1975 as Andrews McMeel Publishing. The Sheed and Ward name and backlist were divested. As of 2024, Kirsty Melville is the CEO.

In 2025, Andrews McMeel Publishing acquired Quirk Books. As a result, Quirk Books Union's dissolved; in an October 2025 post on Instagram, the Union wrote that "the positions of all the remaining union members have been eliminated". Andrews McMeel laid off 12 of their own employees the following day. They also hired a new publisher, Tim Paulson.
