= Michael Hastings, Baron Hastings of Scarisbrick =

British academic (born 1958)

The Right Honourable The Lord Hastings of Scarisbrick CBE
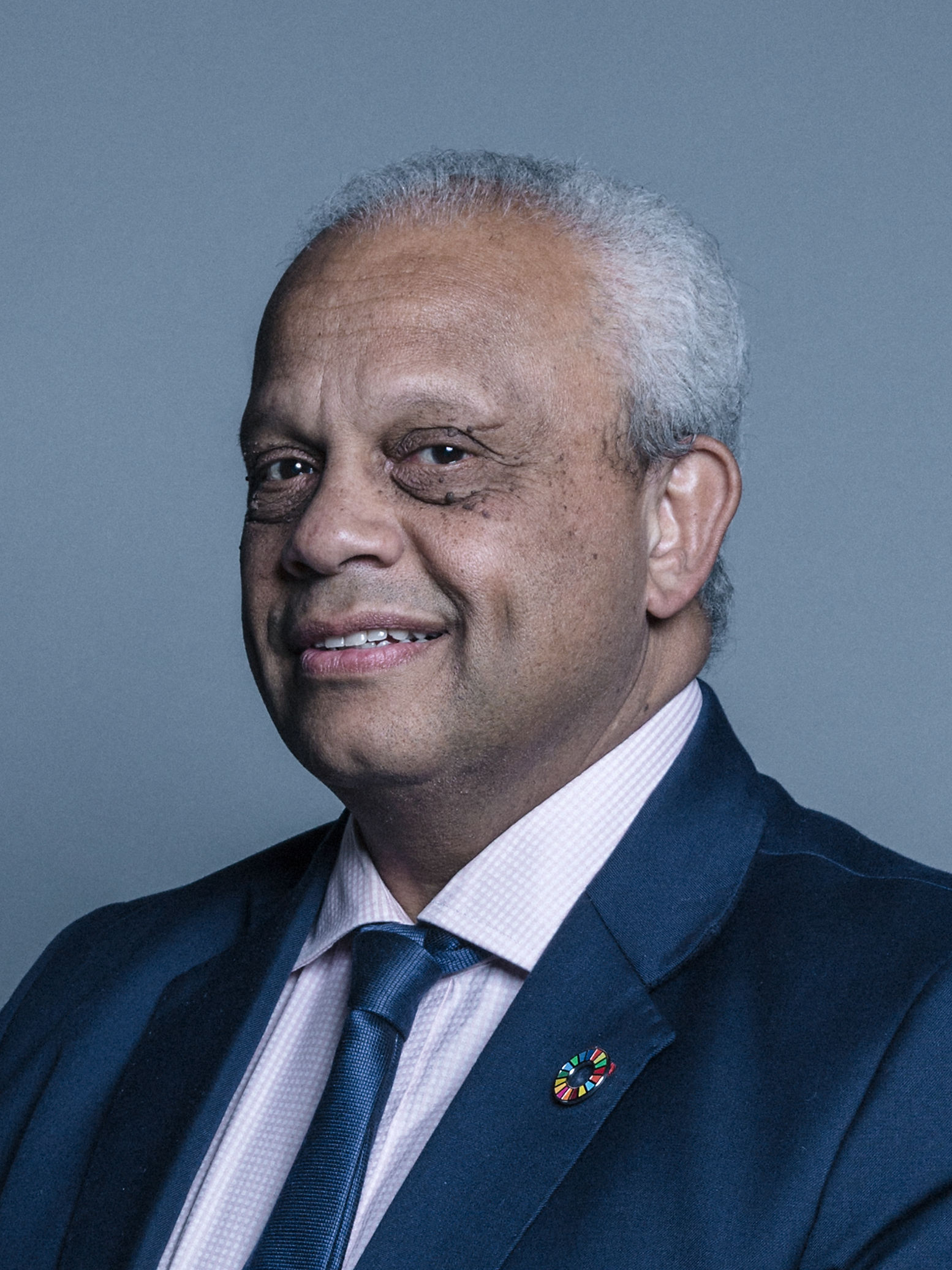
- Official portrait, 2018
- Born: Michael John Hastings; 29 January 1958 (age 68); Widnes, Cheshire, England
- Education: Westminster College, Oxford
- Known for: Independent Peer; Chancellor, Regent’s University; Professor of Leadership, Stephen R Covey Institute; Chair LCCI Black Business Association; VP UNICEF; Gov MPESA Academy, Chair of the SOAS Board of Trustees
- Relatives: Daniel Hastings (brother)

Member of the House of Lords
- Lord Temporal
- Life peerage 12 October 2005

Michael John Hastings, Baron Hastings of Scarisbrick, CBE (born 29 January 1958) is a British Crossbench member of the House of Lords, educator, business executive and public servant. In 2005, he was elevated to the peerage as Baron Hastings of Scarisbrick, taking his seat as a Crossbench member of the House of Lords. Over more than four decades, he has built a career spanning broadcasting, business, higher education, public policy, philanthropy and international development.

Hastings is Chair of the Board of Trustees of SOAS University of London.

He is the Stephen R. Covey Endowed Professor of Leadership at the Jon M. Huntsman School of Business, Utah State University and was the inaugural recipient of the Stephen R Covey Leadership Award in 2019 for a life of leadership based on principles from the Seven Habits of Highly Effective People. He served as Chancellor of Regent's University London from 2016 to 2021. He is the inaugural Chancellor of Christ the Redeemer College in London as it becomes a university.

Prior to his academic leadership roles, Hastings spent more than twelve years at the BBC, where he served as Head of Public Affairs and established the Corporation's first corporate social responsibility programme.

He has held board governance and advisory roles with organizations including UNICEF UK, UK Community Foundations, Saxton Bampfylde, ZANE, the M-PESA Academy in Kenya, Business in the Community, Spark2Life, Cornerstone VC, BT and the Vodafone Group Foundation. He is Chairman of the Pathway Fund, a finance vehicle partly resourced by dormant assets to build stronger economic communities for black minority communities.

Lord Hastings began his career as a teacher before moving into public service, including as the longest-serving Commissioner of the Commission for Racial Equality. He founded Crime Concern in 1988 as the UK’s first crime prevention agency, funded initially by the Home Office and later by business, local authorities & Government grants In 2009, he merged Crime Concern with The Rainer Foundation to create CATCH22 – and later he co-founded My Brother's Keeper, supporting rehabilitation and reintegration for people inside & those leaving prison.

He was appointed Commander of the Order of the British Empire (CBE) in 2003 for services to crime reduction and was created a life peer in 2005. He has also received the UNICEF Award for Services to Africa's Children, an Honorary Doctor of Civil Law from the University of Kent, and the inaugural Stephen R. Covey Leadership Award.

== Early life ==
=== Family and personal life ===
His father was born in Angola and educated in Somerset and Edinburgh, where he qualified as a dental surgeon. From there, he went to Jamaica where he met his wife who was one of his patients. In 1954, they moved back to the UK, where Hastings was born in 1958.

In 1966, the British government was funding professionals to move to Jamaica. His father took the opportunity to return, where he settled in Montego Bay where they built their new home. However, in 1970 a pro-Russian/pro-Cuban government was voted into power and very soon the USA, with memories of the Cuban Bay of Pigs crisis, created a trade blockade of the island, which very soon descended into economic chaos forcing the family to return their two sons once more to the UK.

=== Education ===
Hastings attended Scarisbrick Hall School in Lancashire. While at Scarisbrick, school Principal Charles Oxley asked him to survey a week's television, looking out for swearing, sex, blasphemy, etc. Oxley was Vice President of the National Viewers and Listeners Association, and his results were passed on to Mary Whitehouse, co-founder of the organisation, to support her campaign to promote "better standards" on television.

Having taken his A-Levels, Hastings attended a Theological College in London but soon moved on to study teacher training at Westminster College, Oxford, before spending five years teaching at a London comprehensive school.

== Journalism and business career ==
Hastings began his career as a teacher at Greenway Secondary School in Uxbridge (now Uxbridge High School, London), then, in 1986, moved into government service, supporting policy initiatives to bring employment and development to Britain's inner cities.

In 1990, with his specialist expertise in journalism becoming increasingly known, he was invited by the Chairman of TV-am to join as a producer of programmes looking at school failures. TV-am lost the franchise after one year but Hastings stayed as a presenter on the 6 to 7 am show. He moved to the BBC, where he worked on the weekly Around Westminster programme as its presenter.

From being in front of the camera, he was invited by the Director General to now go behind the camera to lobby for the BBC's Charter Renewal and oversaw the annual fee increases. He also fought off the Murdoch empire's desire to get all premier sports onto subscription and saw the legal provision for listed sports events such as Wimbledon, Cricket, and the Olympics protected for free-to-air viewing. And then GMTV as a chief political correspondent and then the BBC in 1994 as a presenter of the weekly Around Westminster programme, before joining the BBC Corporate Affairs Division in 1996.

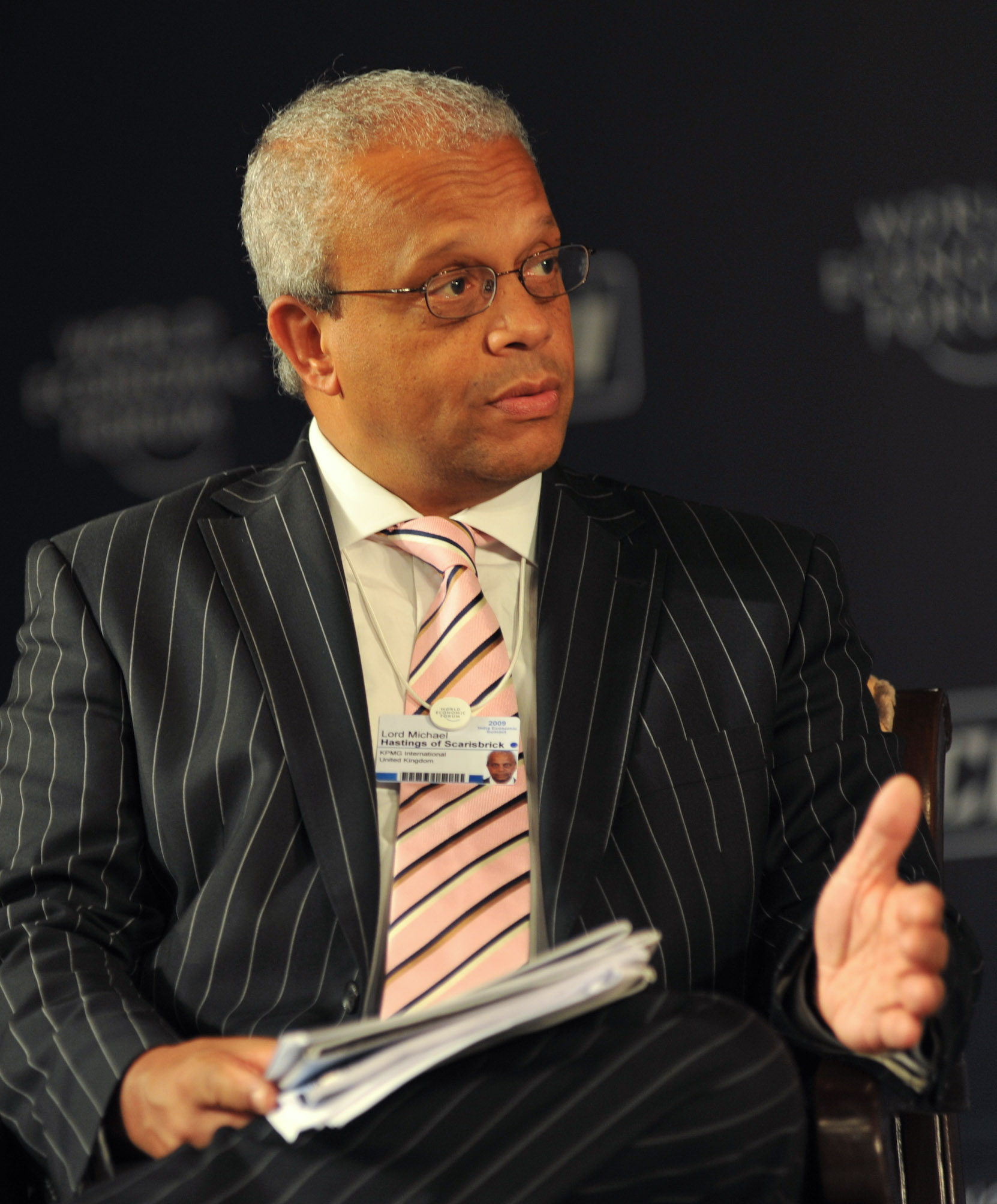
Michael Hastings, Baron Hastings of Scarisbrick, British peer and Director of Corporate Citizenship at KPMG, speaking at the Girl Effect – Investing in Girls, Investing in Development session during the World Economic Forum's India Economic Summit 2009 held in New Delhi.

Hastings is a former trustee of the Vodafone Group Foundation, and previously served for nine years on the Board for Responsible and Sustainable Business at British Telecom (BT). He first represented KPMG International on the Global Corporate Citizenship Committee of the World Economic Forum (WEF) from 2008 to 2010, and was a board director of the Global Reporting Initiative (GRI) from 2010 to 2012. In 2009, he became a member of the World Economic Forum's Global Council on Diversity and Talent; in 2010 he served on the "Global Agenda Council on the Next Generation"; and in 2011 he became a member of the World Economic Forum's Global Agenda Council on the Role of Business. From 2012 to 2014 he led the WEF Agenda Council – The Future of Civil Society, as vice chairman. Hastings is also a global advisor to the Harambe Entrepreneur Alliance.

Hastings was appointed Commander of the Order of the British Empire (CBE) in the 2002 New Year Honours in recognition of his services to crime reduction, including 15 years as chairman and 21 years as a trustee of Crime Concern. He led the merger of Crime Concern with the Rainer Foundation to create the charity Catch22. He served on the Commission for Racial Equality for nine years as a commissioner (1993–2001). He is listed as one of the 100 most influential black people in Britain and No. 6 on the 2016 list of 100 Black British Business Leaders.

== House of Lords ==
In 2005, Hastings was awarded a peerage to the House of Lords by Queen Elizabeth II, where he sits as a crossbencher. In the same year he also received the UNICEF award from the UK Chancellor for his "outstanding contribution to understanding and effecting solutions for Africa's children". Hastings is Chairman of the Council of ZANE, a development aid agency focused on Zimbabwe, and vice president of Tear Fund. In 2011, he became vice president of UNICEF, the UN Children's and Education Fund.

Hastings was chairman of Millennium Promise UK and a member of the global Millennium Promise board. In 2010, he was a leading advisor to the Chatham House enquiry into the Future Role of the UK in Foreign Affairs. He sat on the council of the Overseas Development Institute in the UK and previously on the Center for Global Development in the US.

== Honours ==
In 2014, Hastings was conferred with a doctorate in civil law from the University of Kent, Canterbury, in recognition for his leadership at KPMG, and the BBC on International Development and Corporate Responsibility. He was installed as the Chancellor of Regent's University London in February 2017.

Orders of precedence in the United Kingdom
Preceded by The Lord Turnbull	Gentlemen; Lord Hastings of Scarisbrick	Followed by The Lord Davidson of Glen Cova
