= TaskCracker for Outlook =

Microsoft Outlook add-in for task management

- Developer(s): TaskCracker
- Stable release: 1.3.0 / January 29, 2015; 10 years ago
- Operating system: Microsoft Windows
- Type: Task management
- License: Proprietary
- Website: www.taskcracker.com

TaskCracker for Outlook is a Microsoft Outlook add-in for task- and time-management. It allows managing tasks visually within Microsoft Outlook interface. It is based on the Eisenhower Method of arranging tasks by urgency and importance. It is also loosely based on David Allen's Getting Things Done methodology of improving productivity.

As per posts on the TaskCracker Facebook community page as early as March 2019, the software does not appear to be actively developed any longer.

== Features ==
TaskCracker for Outlook works with native Microsoft Outlook tasks and emails.

- Visual task matrix with urgency and importance axis. This matrix is based on Eisenhower Method as well as Stephen Covey's First Things First approach
- Drag and drop tasks between quadrants to change both urgency and importance simultaneously
- Filter tasks by categories, accounts etc.
- Print matrix to have a hard copy
- Colored categories to mark tasks and email from different projects

== See also ==
- Eisenhower Method
- Stephen Covey
- First Things First (book)
- Getting Things Done
- Inbox Zero
