= Ruminations in an Alien Tongue =

- Illustration by Galen Dara
- Author: Vandana Singh
- Language: English
- Publication date: 2012

Ruminations in an Alien Tongue is a science fiction short story written by Indian science fiction writer and physicist Vandana Singh. The story was originally published in the 23rd issue of Lightspeed, an American online fantasy and science fiction magazine edited and published by John Joseph Adams. It featured in the Thirtieth Annual Collection of The Year’s Best Science Fiction edited by Gardner Dozois in 2013 and also in the science fiction anthology Other Worlds Than These, edited by John Joseph Adams in 2012.

== Plot ==
The story follows Birha, an elderly mathematician and musician living on a planet formerly inhabited by an alien civilization. Nearing the end of her life, she reflects on her career, her relationships, and the discovery that allowed humanity to travel between parallel universes. The narrative is presented non-linearly through Birha's memories and a series of short “ruminations.”

As a young researcher at a university, Birha studied the remains of an alien civilization that humans conquered and believed to have become extinct. The aliens' culture was centered on sound, and their mathematical system was based on probability. Birha consequently studied both alien mathematics and music, learning to construct and play their musical instruments, known as poeticas.

When a young soldier crashed an alien aircraft into an ancient alien stronghold, Birha discovered that the entrance can be opened using a particular acoustic frequency and entered the structure. Inside, she finds the soldier standing beside an alien machine. The machine caused improbable events: the soldier's hand passed through a solid pillar, while Birha's experiment with thirteen coins produced thirteen heads. She concluded that the machine alters probability.

Birha later identified the device as the actualizer, a probability-wave interference machine capable of creating passages between different branches of the kalpa-vriksh, a cosmic tree in which each branch represents a different universe. By altering the parameters of a universe, the actualizer can open a portal to another universe with corresponding properties. The discovery eventually made travel between parallel universes possible.

The connection between the actualizer and parallel universes became clearer when Ubbiri arrived through the machine. Ubbiri explained that her partner, Rudrak, disappeared while testing a “bristleship,” a spacecraft designed to travel through stars. Rudrak and Ubbiri had previously discovered that passing through the core of a white dwarf could lead to a “shadow universe” associated with the star. After Rudrak disappeared during an expedition, Ubbiri took an older bristleship into the same star in an attempt to find him. She left the spacecraft inside the star's alternate reality and eventually arrived in Birha's universe, physically aged by the journey.

Birha determined that Ubbiri had come from another universe and realized that the alien machine provided a connection between the different branches of the kalpa-vriksh. Ubbiri died shortly afterward, leaving a note expressing gratitude for her white dwarf star, Rudrak, and the time she spent with Birha.

Rudrak too began appearing in Birha's life. His bristleship had taken him to a universe almost identical to his own, where he was eventually brought to Birha. She sheltered him and sent him back to his universe using the actualizer. However, Rudrak became trapped in a temporal loop that repeatedly brought him back to Birha. Each time, he remembered neither his previous visits nor Birha and believed he was still searching for Ubbiri. Birha must repeatedly remind him that Ubbiri is dead before sending him back. By the beginning of the story, Rudrak has visited her nine times. Each version is slightly different, suggesting that the effects of the journey extend across both time and universes.

Birha eventually develops a strong affection for Rudrak but does not attempt to make him stay or replace Ubbiri. She accepts that he will continue searching for Ubbiri and regards his repeated visits as a ritual.

As an old woman, Birha realizes that she is approaching death. She continues trying to calculate when Rudrak will return, but the probability distributions produce multiple possible answers. She eventually recognizes that her frustration with Rudrak's absence is connected to her love for the people, places, and experiences that have shaped her life. She considers eventually dying in the forest and becoming part of its ecosystem.

Three days later, Rudrak appears at her door again, but this version is visibly different from the previous ones. Birha realizes that her calculations had assumed that identities remained constant across different universes and points in time. She concludes instead that identity is not invariant or closed. The new Rudrak says that he is looking for Ubbiri and asks whether he has been to Birha's house before. The story ends on an open note, with implications suggesting the persistence of connections between individuals despite their changing identities and circumstances.
