= Stacy Curtis =

American cartoonist

Stacy Curtis (born 1971) is an American cartoonist, illustrator and printmaker, who also served as the inker of Richard Thompson's comic strip Cul de Sac in 2012.

Curtis and his twin brother Tracy grew up in Bowling Green, Kentucky, where the young Stacy dreamed of working on a comic strip. He recalled, "As a kid, I would read the comics in the newspaper every single day. In elementary school, I drew Snoopy, Garfield, Popeye and other comic strip characters on classmates' folders for money." During his senior year in high school, Curtis began drawing editorial cartoons for the school newspaper and soon moved on to do editorial cartoons for Bowling Green's Daily News during his first year studying graphic design at Western Kentucky University.

At the same time, he started doing illustrations for Western Kentucky University's student newspaper, the College Heights Herald, and he continued to draw editorial cartoons for both papers while staying in college for the next six years:

I actually stayed on at the University for longer. Like I could have graduated in four years, but I stayed on longer, two more years, so I could continue being the cartoonist there. I was in college for like seven years. It was kind of like it is now; there's no jobs. I said, hey, I was getting paid as the editorial cartoonist at the paper, so I'm like, this is kind of my job. I just took the bare minimum classes that I had to each semester, so I could work at the paper.

== Books ==
Six months after graduating from Western Kentucky University, he began employment July 1996 at The Times of Northwest Indiana, where he drew five to seven editorial cartoons each week for ten years. He was let go from that position in 2006, at a time when newspapers were eliminating their editorial cartoonists, leaving approximately 80 full-time editorial cartoonists in the United States.

Curtis then began a new career as a children's book illustrator, eventually illustrating more than 25 children's books, including a New York Times Best Seller, Sean Covey's The 7 Habits of Happy Kids, a version of Stephen Covey's The Seven Habits of Highly Effective People simplified for children.

His clients include BowTie Press, the Chicago Tribune, Cricket, Highlights, Innovative Kids, Scholastic, Simon & Schuster and Standard Publishing.

== Comic strips ==
On March 26, 2012, Curtis became the inker of the daily Cul de Sac comic strip. The first Sunday strip inked by Curtis was published June 17, 2012. Curtis' tenure on Cul de Sac ended with the strip's conclusion in September 2012.

Curtis lives with his wife Jann in Oak Lawn, Illinois, where he lectures on creativity at schools and libraries, noting, "I visit several elementary schools every year and give presentations about being an illustrator and the importance of reading, drawing and being creative."

== Exhibitions ==
- Terra Nova Gallery (Provo, Utah): Dueling Banjo Pigs (April 1–29, 2011).

== Bibliography ==
- The 7 Habits of Happy Kids, written by Sean Covey, published by Simon & Schuster
- The Meghan Rose series, written by Lori Z. Scott, published by Standard Publishing.
- The Raymond and Graham series, written by Mike Knudson, published by Viking Press.
- Snack Attack, written by Stephen Krensky, published by Simon & Schuster.
- The Fix-It Crew, written by Lara Bergen, published by Innovative Kids.
- One by One, written by Mickey Daniels, published by Scholastic.
