= Jon M. Huntsman School of Business =

Business school at Utah State University

Coordinates: 41°44′28″N 111°48′34″W

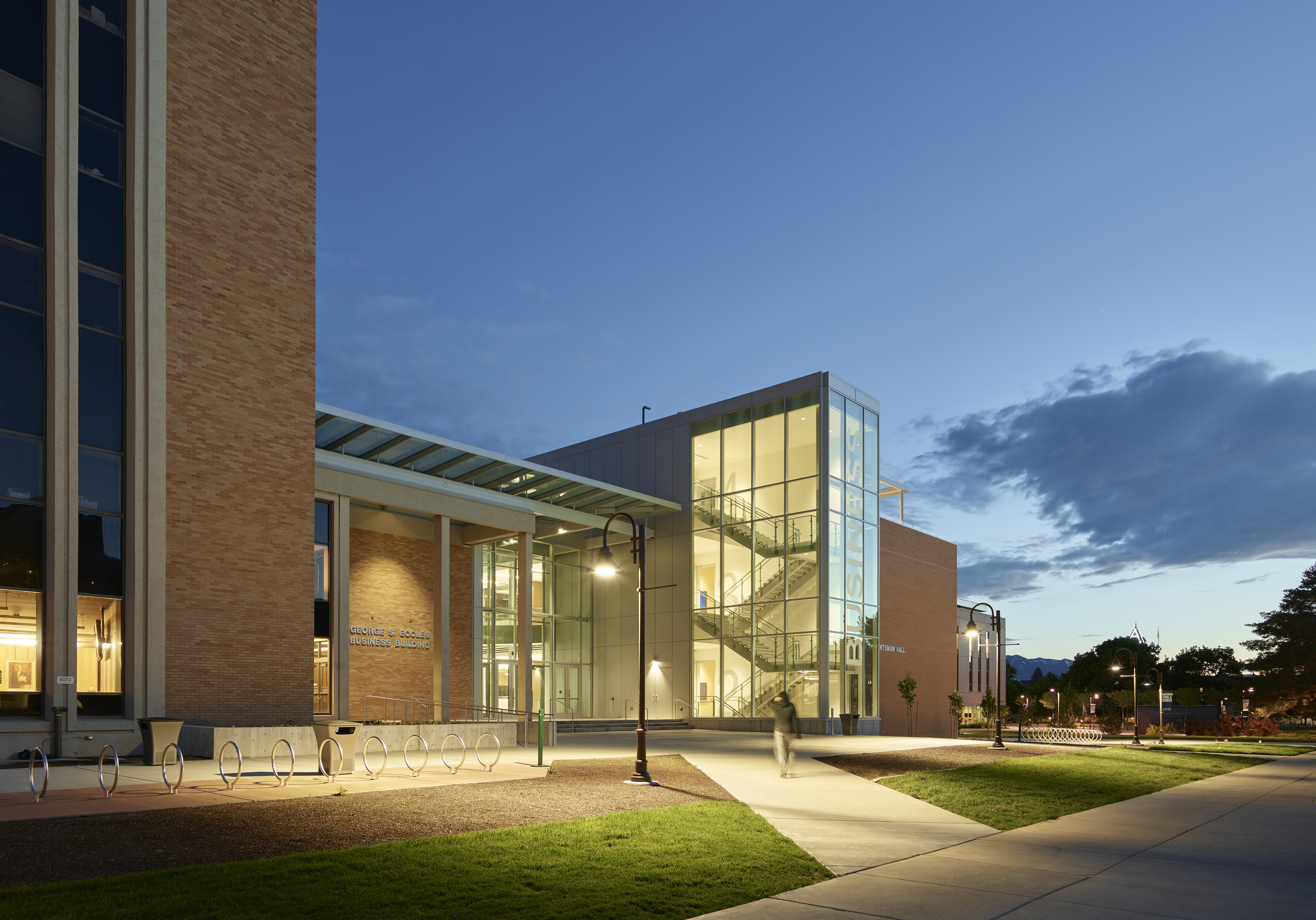
- Type: Public
- Established: 1889
- Affiliations: Utah State University
- Dean: Frank Caliendo (interim)
- Faculty: 168
- Students: 3,500
- Location: Logan, UT, United States
- Alumni: 31,000
- Website: https://huntsman.usu.edu/

The Jon M. Huntsman School of Business is located at Utah State University (USU) in Logan, Utah. The school was founded in 1889, when the only other four-year business school in the United States was the Wharton School of the University of Pennsylvania, making the Huntsman School the second oldest college of business in the country and the oldest west of the Mississippi River.

== History ==
The business school was founded in 1889, one year after USU was founded, as the college's Commercial Department. The first students graduated in 1894. The program underwent several organizational revisions and name changes in its first two decades. By 1911, the program (then named School of Commerce) was already recognized as a leading business institution. A 1911 newspaper report about the economics department said:

When so eminent an authority as professor L. C. Marshall of the University of Chicago reports that the work in the department of economics of our school is comparable to that given in the best institutions in the country, we feel that we are paid one of the highest tributes ever. ... In the number of hours of instruction given, the number of students in the courses, and the general standard of the courses, we are surpassed by only a very few of the large universities.

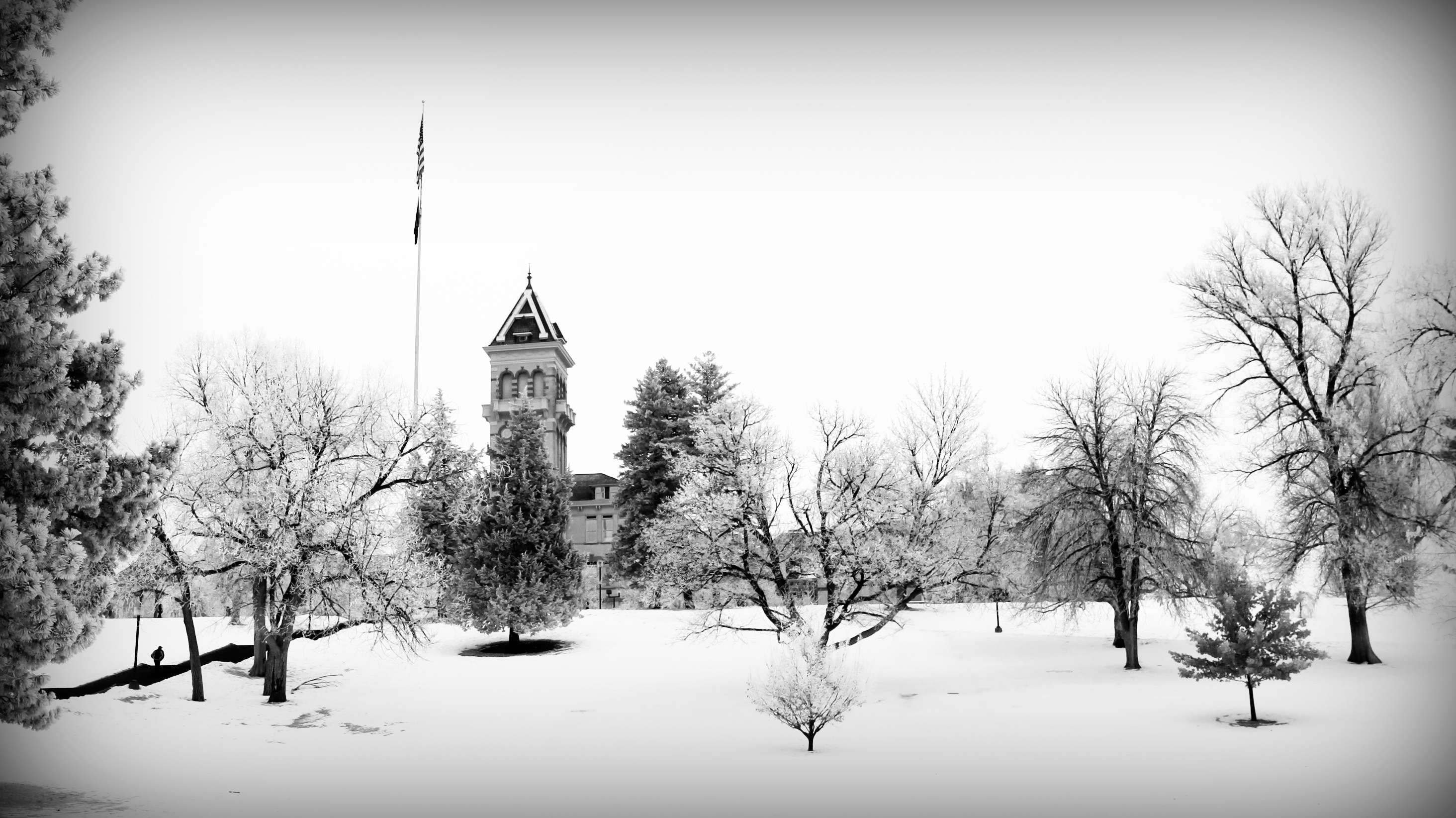
Old Main, the original home of the School

In 1918, the school became known as the School of Commerce and Business Administration. At that time, the school included five departments: markets, business administration, accounting, political science, and history. Other majors were added over time.

In 1952, under the direction of Professor C. D. McBride, the Management Institute was established. Utah's economy was rapidly shifting from agriculture to business, and USU, as Utah's land-grant institution, had an obligation to provide educational services in business and industry throughout Utah comparable to those offered in agriculture and rural life through the Cooperative Extension Service. The Management Institute provided educational services for businesses.

By 1957, the School of Commerce and Business Administration had become the College of Business and Social Sciences, with M. R. Merrill as dean. Three of the four departments were strictly social science: history and political science, economics, and sociology. In 1959, Robert P. Collier became acting dean. The college included departments of business administration and secretarial science; history and political science; sociology and social work; and economics.

By 1966, business courses were taught in more than a dozen buildings on campus. Accounting, which had enjoyed department status early in the college's history but had been under business administration for many years, became a separate department again; in addition to accounting, the College of Business included six other departments, including the Division of Military Science and Aerospace Studies.

The time had come for the college to have its own building. The Utah Building Board approved a $600,000 federal grant for a business building, and on Jan. 11, 1967, the USU Board of Trustees approved the building's schematic plans. The groundbreaking ceremony was held on Dec. 10, 1968, with a projected cost of $1,591,700. On May 8, 1970, the building was dedicated as the George S. Eccles Business Building.

The Eccles Building is nine stories high. Its original design included a three-story classroom base and six additional stories of faculty offices, seminar rooms, and other facilities. The building has undergone multiple renovations since then.

The College of Business's undergraduate program was accredited by the Association to Advance Collegiate Schools of Business (AACSB) in 1971, and the graduate (master's) program was accredited by the AACSB in 1981.

In February 1983, the Department of Accounting became the School of Accountancy. By 1986, the College of Business had a full-time enrollment of approximately 1,398 students in its undergraduate and graduate programs (Self-Study Report, 1986). Thirty-nine full-time and 32 part-time faculty were employed in three departments: business administration, administrative systems and business education, and accounting. The Department of Economics remained under the joint administration of the Colleges of Business and Agriculture.

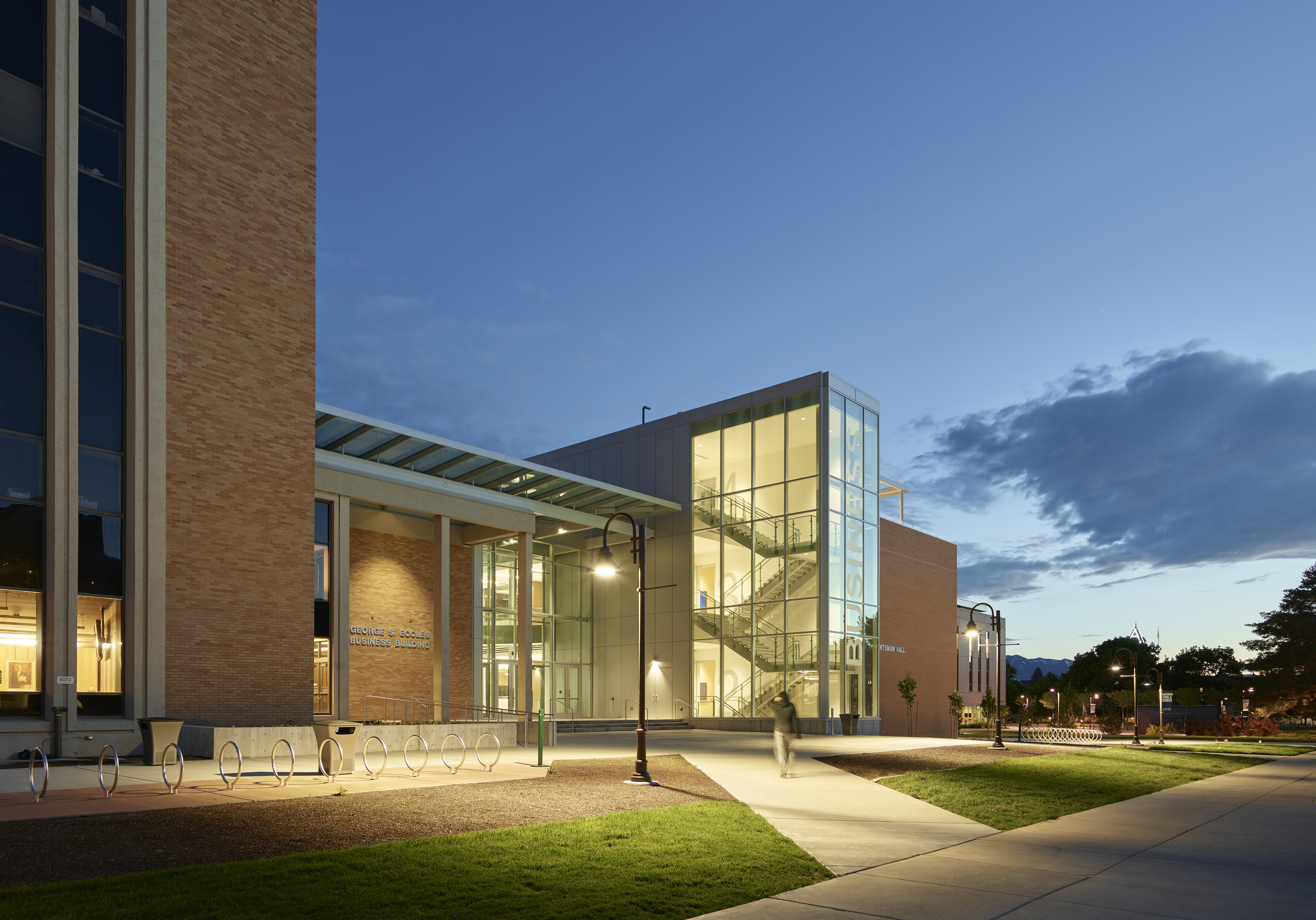
The Jon M. Huntsman School of Business' north-facing entrances.

In 2007, Utah State's College of Business became the Jon M. Huntsman School of Business after a $26 million donation by the Huntsman Foundation.

On March 16, 2016, Jon M. Huntsman Hall was dedicated and opened. The building is a 125,000-square-foot student-centered facility with 21 classrooms, 21 meeting spaces, faculty/administration offices, and event spaces.

On May 6, 2017, the Huntsman School announced a joint $50 million gift from the Huntsman Foundation and the Charles Koch Foundation, the largest in the school's history.

The Stephen R. Covey Leadership Center was established on November 2, 2018. Its purpose is to develop principle-centered leaders.

As of 2026, the Huntsman School offers nine undergraduate majors, 20 undergraduate minors, eight graduate degree programs and five additional graduate certificate programs.

== Location ==
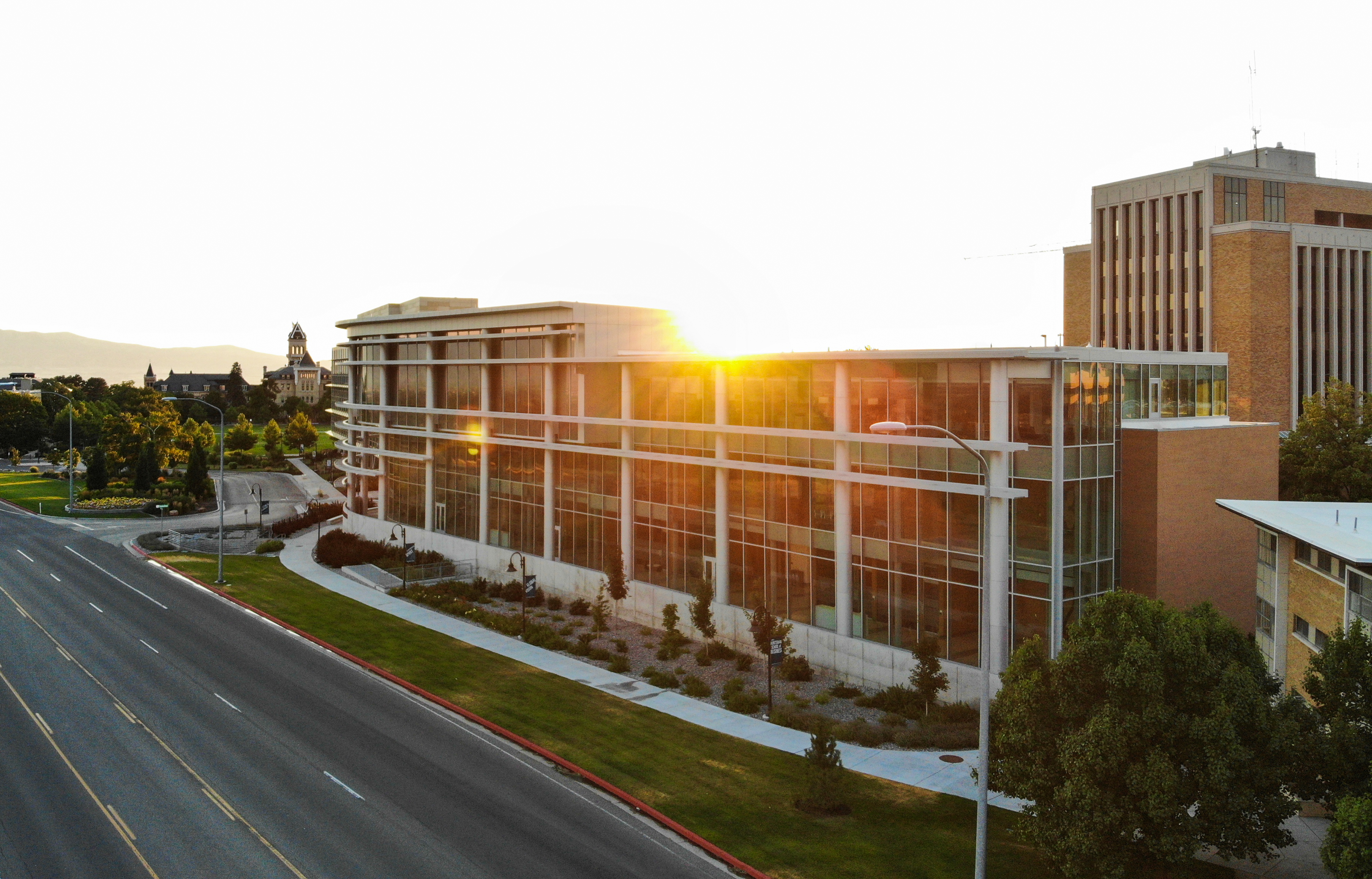
The Jon M. Huntsman School of Business completed construction on its expansion in 2016.

The George S. Eccles Business Building underwent a major renovation in 2008, made possible by a $1 million grant from the George S. and Dolores Doré Eccles Foundation.

In 2011, the Utah Legislature approved funding for a new business building, Jon M. Huntsman Hall, located southwest of the Eccles Business Building. The building was funded by $36 million in private funds and $14 million in state funds. The 125,000-square-foot building includes 21 classrooms, 21 student meeting rooms, office spaces, and multiple event spaces.

On August 29, 2025, the Huntsman School completed construction of the Carolyn & Kem Gardner Learning & Leadership Building (GLLB), completing a multi-building "campus" for the Huntsman School. The GLLB is a state-of-the-art facility dedicated entirely to experiential business and leadership training. Acting as a "Center of Centers" for the Jon M. Huntsman School of Business, it houses the following:

- The Stephen R. Covey Leadership Center
- The Center for Entrepreneurship
- The Analytics Solutions Center
- The Huntsman Scholar Program
- The Huntsman Hive / Freshman Academy

== Academics ==
The Huntsman School comprises five academic units: the Department of Data Analytics and Information Systems, the Department of Economics and Finance, the Department of Management, the Department of Marketing and Strategy, and the School of Accountancy.

=== Undergraduate offerings ===
The Huntsman School offers nine majors encompassing the core business disciplines and 20 specialized minors.

=== Graduate offerings ===
The Huntsman School offers eight business graduate programs. All eight graduate programs are offered on-campus to full-time students. MBA and MHR are available as part-time programs with delivery methods tailored for working professionals. The school also offers concurrent enrollment graduate programs. Students can select two majors from MBA, MHR, and MMIS and complete two graduate degrees in 2 years.

== Centers ==
- The Center for Entrepreneurship offers classes, internships, and competitions. Its programs include the Entrepreneurship Leadership and Huntsman Venture Forum Speaker Series, an entrepreneurship minor, the Small Enterprise Education and Development (SEED) internship program, and various competitions. In 2019, the United States Association for Small Business and Entrepreneurship (USASBE) awarded the School first place for Excellence in Co-Curricular Innovation for its Small Enterprise Education and Development (SEED) Program.
- FJ Management Center for Student Success combines various student services, including academic student advising and career development, under one organizational structure.
- Stephen R. Covey Leadership Center s goal is to develop principle-centered leaders through its curriculum, co-curricular activities, and coaching.
- Shingo Institute offers educational workshops and executive education programs, organizes study tours, hosts an annual conference, and annually awards the Shingo Prize for Operational Excellence.
- The Center for Growth and Opportunity trains undergraduate and graduate students, conducts economic research with a national network of scholars, and communicates transformative solutions to some of the country’s most pressing issues.

== Experiential learning and offerings ==
- Huntsman Scholar Program is a selective honors undergraduate business program on the Logan campus. Students receive a stipend for up to four years, a fully funded global learning experience, and participate in curricular, co-curricular, and extra-curricular experiences. Students are assigned a faculty mentor and can build relationships with faculty, staff, alumni, and fellow students.
- The Small Enterprise Education and Development Program (SEED) connects students with opportunities to teach enterprise creation and sustainability in Ghana, Guatemala, Peru, the Philippines, and the Dominican Republic.
- Focused Fridays at the School are dedicated to job search workshops, technical training, keynote forums, and networking opportunities.
- Global Learning Experiences prepares students for an international business environment. Program options include summer programs to Asia and South America, spring break programs to London and Paris, semester exchange programs, and international internships.

== People ==
=== Faculty ===
In 2006, Douglas D. Anderson became the dean of the College of Business at USU. A year later, he secured a $26 million gift from Jon Huntsman Sr. to rename the college the Jon M. Huntsman School of Business. In 2017, Anderson helped secure a $50 million joint gift from the Huntsman Foundation and the Charles Koch Foundation. Anderson stepped down as dean on July 1, 2026, after 20 years, to return to teaching. Frank Caliendo has served as interim dean since then, and Valentina Salotti, senior associate dean for academic affairs at Iowa State University's Ivy College of Business, becomes dean on January 1, 2027.

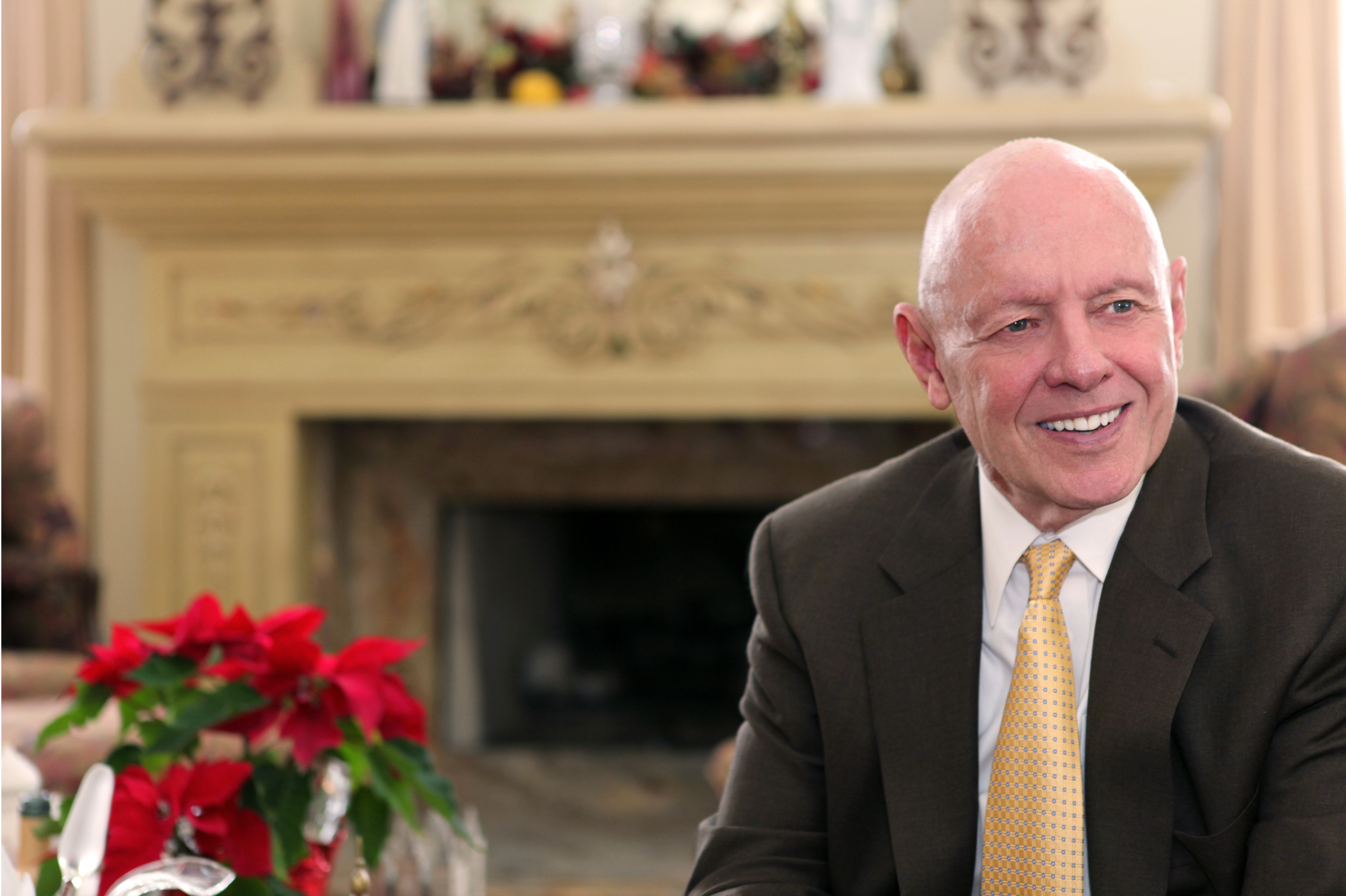
Stephen R. Covey taught at the Huntsman School from 2010-2012.

In 2010, USU and the Huntsman School of Business announced that Stephen R. Covey would join its faculty as the school's first Jon M. Huntsman Presidential Chair. Covey was the author of Seven Habits of Highly Effective People. In 2019, the school created a $15 million Fund for Faculty Excellence, combining $12 million from the Huntsman Foundation with a $3 million match from the school, to endow five professorships. In 2020, Lord Hastings of Scarisbrick, a crossbench member of the House of Lords, and Boyd Craig were named the inaugural Stephen R. Covey Endowed Professors of Leadership. In 2021, the Huntsman School hired Oxford professor Teppo Felin to become the inaugural Douglas D. Anderson Endowed Professor of Strategy and Entrepreneurship. Lord Hastings of Scarisbrick, a crossbench member of the House of Lords, holds the school's Stephen R. Covey Endowed Professorship of Leadership.

=== Alumni ===
- Gar Forman '84 - General Manager, Chicago Bulls
- Eric Hipple '80 - former NFL Quarterback, Detroit Lions
- Merlin Olsen '62 - Athlete, Los Angeles Rams; Broadcaster, NBC Sports; Actor.
- L. Tom Perry '49 - Apostle, The Church of Jesus Christ of Latter-day Saints
- Steven E. Snow '74 - General Authority, The Church of Jesus Christ of Latter-day Saints
- Christopher "Chris" Stewart '84 - Best Selling Author, New York Times; Congressman, Utah's 2nd congressional district.
- Gary E. Stevenson '79 - Apostle, The Church of Jesus Christ of Latter-day Saints; Co-founder of ICON Health & Fitness

== Differential tuition oversight ==
In November 2017, The Utah Statesman reported that a Differential Tuition Advisory Board, created in 2015 under an agreement with USU's student government to advise the dean on spending the more than $8 million a year the school collects in differential tuition, had never met. Business students paid an average of about $2,000 a year more than other USU students. A university spokesman called the lapse "a failure for certain," and the school convened the board for the first time that December.
