= Sean Covey =

American business executive (born 1964)

- Born: M. Sean Merrill Covey; September 17, 1964; Belfast, Ireland
- Education: Brigham Young University (BA); Harvard University (MBA)
- Occupation: Author
- Father: Stephen Covey
- Football career

No. 10
- Position: Quarterback

Career information
- High school: Provo (Provo, Utah)
- College: BYU (1986–1988)

Awards and highlights
- Utah High School Class AAA MVP (1982)
- Website: seancovey.com

Sean Covey (born September 17, 1964) is an American business executive, author, and speaker. He is president of FranklinCovey Education and also serves as executive vice president of Global Partnerships. Covey's works include The 4 Disciplines of Execution, The 6 Most Important Decisions You'll Ever Make, The 7 Habits of Happy Kids, and The 7 Habits of Highly Effective Teens, which has been translated into 20 languages and sold over 8 million copies worldwide.

== Early life and education ==
Covey was born in Belfast, Ireland, and grew up in Provo, Utah. He attended Provo High School where he was the starting quarterback for three years. In 1982 during his senior year, he led Provo High to win its first football state championship in school history.

In 1983, Covey was the starting quarterback for the Brigham Young University (BYU) junior varsity football team.

During 1984–1985, Covey served as a missionary for The Church of Jesus Christ of Latter-day Saints in South Africa.

Covey was the starting quarterback on BYU's football team during the 1987 and 1988 seasons, where he led his team to two bowl games and received numerous honors. At the end of his junior season, he seriously injured his knee and had reconstructive knee surgery during the off-season, which effectively ended his football career.

Covey graduated from BYU with a degree in English and with University Honors. He later earned his MBA from Harvard Business School.

== Professional background ==
Following his college football career, Covey worked at Deloitte and Touche consulting in Boston, followed by Trammel Crow Ventures in Dallas. He then attended Harvard Business School. After graduating from Harvard Business School, Covey joined FranklinCovey where he has worked in several roles, including Productivity Practice Leader, Vice President of Retail Stores, Vice President of Innovations and Products, Executive Vice President of International, and President of FranklinCovey Education. While working at FranklinCovey, he also began writing educational and business books. Collectively, his books have sold over 10 million copies worldwide.

Covey wrote a book entitled The 7 Habits of Highly Effective Teens, based on the principles of The Seven Habits of Highly Effective People written by his father, Stephen R. Covey. The book has become an international best seller, having sold more than eight million copies and having been translated into over 20 languages. The book has been chosen as one of the four books for the MIST interscholastic competition knowledge test.

His follow-up book is entitled The 6 Most Important Decisions You Will Ever Make. The book directs the six big choices teenagers will make in their teenage years. These six decisions are: School, Friends, Parents, Dating and Sex, Addictions and Self Worth. This book was followed by a series of children's books, including the New York Times best-seller, The 7 Habits of Happy Kids, which was illustrated by Stacy Curtis. Covey later co-authored several books for adults, including The Leader in Me: How Schools Around the World Are Inspiring Greatness, One Child at a Time, and another book entitled, The 4 Disciplines of Execution which was named a #1 Wall Street Journal Business Best-Seller and quickly became an international best-seller.

== Published works ==
Books for Teens

- Covey, Sean. The 6 Most Important Decisions You'll Ever Make Personal Workbook, Fireside, 2008. ISBN 978-0-7432-6505-8
- Covey, Sean. The Choice is Yours: The 7 Habits Activity Guide for Teens, Franklin Covey, 2007. ISBN 978-1-933976-61-7
- Covey, Sean. The 6 Most Important Decisions You'll Ever Make: A Guide for Teens, Fireside, 2006. ISBN 978-0-7432-6504-1
- Covey, Sean. The 7 Habits of Highly Effective Teenagers: Personal Workbook , Simon & Schuster, 2005. ISBN 978-0-7432-6817-2
- Covey, Sean. The 7 Habits of Highly Effective Teens Personal Workbook, Fireside, 2003. ISBN 978-0-7385-0410-0
- Covey, Sean. The 7 Habits Journal for Teens, Fireside, 2002. ISBN 978-0-7432-3707-9
- Covey, Sean. Daily Reflections For Highly Effective Teens, Fireside, 1999. ISBN 978-0-684-87060-1
- Covey, Sean. The 7 Habits of Highly Effective Teens, Fireside, 1998. ISBN 978-0-684-85609-4
- Covey, Sean. Fourth Down and Life to Go: How to Turn Life's Setbacks into Triumphs, Barnes & Noble Books-Imports, 1990. ISBN 978-0-88494-772-1

Books for Children

- Covey, Sean. A Place for Everything: Habit 3 (The 7 Habits of Happy Kids), Simon & Schuster Children's Publishing, 2010. ISBN 978-1-4169-9425-1
- Covey, Sean. Just the Way I Am: Habit 1 (The 7 Habits of Happy Kids), Simon & Schuster Children's Publishing, 2009. ISBN 978-1-4169-9423-7
- Covey, Sean. When I Grow Up: Habit 2 (The 7 Habits of Happy Kids), Simon & Schuster Children's Publishing, 2009. ISBN 978-1-4169-9424-4
- Covey, Sean. The 7 Habits of Happy Kids, Simon & Schuster Children's Publishing, 2008. ISBN 978-1-4169-5776-8

Books for Adults

- Covey, Sean (co-authors Stephen R. Covey, David K. Hatch, and Muriel Summers). The Leader in Me: How Schools around the World Are Inspiring Greatness, One Child at a Time, Simon & Schuster Paperbacks, 2014. ISBN 978-1-4767-7218-9
- Covey, Sean (co-authors Chris McChesney and Jim Huling). The 4 Disciplines of Execution: Achieving Your Wildly Important Goals, Free Press, 2012. ISBN 978-1-4516-2705-3
