= Cul de Sac (comic strip) =

American comic strip created by Richard Thompson

- Cul de Sac (February 5, 2008)
- Author: Richard Thompson
- Website: www.gocomics.com/culdesac/
- Launch date: February 2004; September 9, 2007 (daily syndication)
- End date: September 23, 2012
- Syndicate(s): Universal Press Syndicate/Universal Uclick
- Publisher: Andrews McMeel Publishing
- Genre(s): Humor, family life, children

Cul de Sac is an American comic strip created by Richard Thompson. It was distributed by Universal Press Syndicate/Universal Uclick to 150 worldwide newspapers from 2004 to 2012.

The central character is four-year-old Alice Otterloop, and the strip depicts her daily life at pre-school and at home.

== Publication history ==
Thompson, also known for his weekly Richard's Poor Almanac strip in The Washington Post, began Cul de Sac as a limited strip in The Washington Post in February 2004. In September 2007, Cul de Sac entered daily syndication with the Universal Press Syndicate. Digital distribution is by Uclick GoComics.

=== Guest cartoonists and final strip ===
On July 16, 2009, Thompson announced that he had been diagnosed with Parkinson's disease, a problem he described as "a pain in the fundament", which slowed him down but did not affect his drawing hand. He took a hiatus from the strip.

During the hiatus several other cartoonists stepped in to draw the Cul de Sac characters. The guest artists were Michael Jantze (The Norm), Corey Pandolph (The Elderberries), Lincoln Peirce (Big Nate), Stephan Pastis (Pearls Before Swine), Ruben Bolling (Tom the Dancing Bug) and children's author Mo Willems.

Upon Thompson's return to Cul de Sac on March 26, 2012, it was announced that children's book illustrator Stacy Curtis would become the inker of Cul de Sac.

On August 17, 2012, Thompson announced that due to health issues he would be ending his work as a comic-strip creator, with his final Cul de Sac being published on September 23, 2012.

While Thompson had originally planned to draw a final strip for the comic himself, one day before its previously announced publishing date he posted a message online, stating, "Spoiler alert – i couldn't draw a new Sunday so tomorrow's is a repeat too. Sorry! I'll do better next time." That strip was a rerun originally published on February 18, 2007, which had also appeared on the back cover of the first book collection, Cul De Sac: This Exit in 2008. In it, Petey explains to Alice how comic strips are "a mighty, yet dying art form."

Thompson died at 58 on July 27, 2016.

== Characters and story ==
Richard Thompson's Cul de Sac (November 20, 2005). To see this image at a higher resolution, go to Cul de Sac.

Universal Press Syndicate describes Cul de Sac as "a light-hearted comic strip centered around Alice, a four-year-old girl and her suburban life experiences on a cul-de-sac with her friends Beni and Dill, older brother Petey and her classmates at Blisshaven Academy pre-school. Alice describes her father's car as a Honda-Tonka Cuisinart and talks to the class guinea pig, Mr. Danders. She has the typical older brother who plays jokes on her, and she contemplates ways to keep the scary clown from jumping out of the jack-in-the-box with friends."

Alice Otterloop
The strip's main character. A willful four-year old girl living in suburbia. The strip typically focuses on her exposure to new things and her commentary on these experiences. She enjoys dancing on manhole covers.

Petey Otterloop
Alice's older brother Petey is quiet, bookish, more experienced and is Alice's primary source of information on new phenomena. The eight-year-old has been called "King of the Picky Eaters" by his mother; however according to Internet rankings, he still is not the world's pickiest eater. Petey often describes mundane school and suburban experiences in a mythic style as though the information was being passed down from generation to generation of school children. A comic devotee, he is also an aspiring comic artist, who is forever working on and revising his own graphic novel, Toad Zombies. Petey only considers himself to have three and a half friends (Viola, Andre, Loris, and Ernesto, who only counts as half a friend since he might be imaginary.) Thompson has said that Petey, Andre and Loris together are like an atom, with Andre as the proton, Petey as the neutron, and Loris as the electron.

Madeline Otterloop
Alice and Petey's mother is a stay-at-home mom taking care of the day-to-day running of the household. She is often seen driving the children around in a van of a color "so neutral that it does not occur in nature". Mrs. Otterloop's maiden name is Urquhart.

Peter Otterloop
Alice and Petey's father is seen less frequently and works a daily office job at an unnamed location. Peter Sr. is bald, slight in build, and nerdy like his son. Before the strip was rebooted for syndication, his employer was described as the Federal "Department of Consumption". However, a number of Washington, D.C.-specific features have disappeared since the reboot, and his employer has not been mentioned since. According to the official website, he currently works as the "Assistant Director of Pamphlets at the U.S. Department of Consumption, Office of Consumer Complaints". He commutes to work in a car that Alice describes as a "Honda-Tonka Cuisinart".

GrandMa
Madeline's Mom used to wave at traffic from her yard. When the traffic turned ugly, she started to retaliate by throwing deviled eggs at cars. She lives with Big Shirley, a large friendly dog.

Dill Wedekind
Dill, the Caucasian friend with the few bristles of hair, is possibly the most eccentric character in the strip, frequently making strange or unrelated statements. He is in the same class and neighborhood as Alice, as well as one of her best friends. A running joke is his reference to his unseen disreputable older brothers. He sometimes rides a yellow tricycle with blue wheels.

Beni
Along with Dill, Beni is Alice's other best friend, the dark-haired and dark-skinned one. He appears to be technically minded and is skilled with tools; his grandmother "tells filthy jokes in Spanish" and he himself once used the interjection "Hijole!" implying he might be Hispanic. He is good at soccer.

Ernesto Lacuna
Ernesto is a crossing guard that Petey met and initially thought existed only in his imagination. He wears glasses and is always well-groomed in a tie and vest. When he was fired from his crossing guard position, he blamed Petey. He declared his affection for Viola and claimed a super-power (putting people's feet to sleep). He speaks and acts like an adult and frequently chides Petey for his 'childish' pursuits or interests. Petey just wishes he would go away. Andre has told Petey definitively that Ernesto is imaginary, though he has yet to prove it; Mrs. Otterloop and Viola have both interacted with Ernesto, implying that he in fact exists.

Viola D'More
Viola, a girl in Petey's school band, plays the marimba. She wears glasses and has curly hair. She calls Petey "Petey Potterpoop" (a nickname which had, in fact, been given to Mr. Otterloop when he was Petey's age) and seems to enjoy embarrassing him, although she is always friendly and has never been deliberately cruel. Their relationship remains ambiguous, Petey sometimes seems to like her and at other times is almost indifferent. Alice calls her Petey's "almost girlfriend". Viola has an over-sized backpack with many adornments, one of which (a purple unicorn) she gave Petey as a charm against Ernesto. It apparently worked since Petey did not see Ernesto for several days after. For a long time, her last name was uncertain; Ernesto called her 'Viola D'More' when he was claiming her as 'his love' (see Viola d'amore). The D'More surname was confirmed in a June 2010 strip.

Marcus DeMarco
A classmate of Alice. Bespectacled and nerdy, Marcus is scared of his mother, who is always documenting him for scrapbooks.

Ms. Bliss
The only teacher at Blisshaven Academy, a pre-school attended by Alice, Beni, Dill and Marcus. She loves education and is usually cheerful. She often becomes irritated with the children's constant antics. She has been engaged multiple times to Timmy Fretwork, the Banjo Man, although they have yet to wed. Thompson has admitted on several occasions that Bliss is her first name, not her surname.

Mr. Danders
Blisshaven's pet guinea pig. Mr. Danders claims to be well read and has many literary opinions. He often speaks using eloquent, long words. A prominent character in the strip's early days, he last appeared in March 2012 when the strip featured guest cartoonists.

Andre Chang
A heavyset boy Petey met at cartoon camp. He has bushy hair with thick bangs, coke-bottle glasses, and wears shirts with sound effects printed on the front. He likes to read comics with much action and noise. He gets along very well with Alice. He has four sisters.

Loris Slothrop
A short girl who goes to cartoon camp with Petey. She has big eyes, although her right eye is usually covered by her hair. She has from two to three ponytails sticking from her hair. When asked what type of comics she prefers, she said she likes "little cute animal cartoons with big eyes who're also magic robot vampire ninjas, but sensitive," an example being "Squirrelly Shirley, the pink robot alien girl crime-fighter who's a werewolf squirrel." Loris's self-made comic book, "Lulu Lightspeed," "deals realistically with issues facing blue, big-eyed robots with pointed ears." She has been shown to be very fast, being the first one to run out the door when a bee invaded the cartoon camp. The surname "Slothrop" is shared with Tyrone Slothrop, the protagonist of Gravity's Rainbow by Thomas Pynchon.

Nara
A preschooler about whom few details have surfaced. She frequently brings duck-shaped potatoes for show and tell, much to Alice's chagrin. Nara is in ballet and has gone to watch a ballet before.

Sofie
A girl who came to Blisshaven more recently. At first she seemed very timid, sitting silently in the corner. After Alice dubbed her "Weird New Kid", Sofie revealed her aggressive nature. Alice is also seemingly incapable of remembering Sofie's name, frequently calling her "Soapie" and/or "Sofa", but considers her her new best friend.

Kevin
A preschooler with blond hair, prominent ears, and a "bucket head", according to Alice. He seems to have many anxieties and is a natural target for Alice's teasing.

Uh-Oh Baby
A baby that just shows up occasionally and says "uh-oh." The baby is never accompanied by an adult and no-one knows where it comes from. The kids always react in fear.

== Recurring themes ==
Mr. Otterloop's car
This 'clown car' is tiny, hence the recurring visual and verbal gags about its size. Alice says it is "half cuisinart".

Manhole cover
Alice and her friends use a manhole cover in a nearby vacant lot as a soapbox for performance art or to declare opinions.

Shoebox dioramas
Petey is slowly documenting the history of man through the medium of shoebox dioramas which he keeps beneath his bed.

Big Shirley
Big Shirley is a large, friendly dog that belongs to Alice's grandmother. Alice is completely terrified of Big Shirley, once even abandoning her precious toy bunny Polyfil to save herself from the dog's slobbering clutches.

Little Neuro
A strip-within-the-strip, a parody of Little Nemo. Petey's favorite reading, a strip about a little boy who hardly ever stirs from his bed.

Sports
On several occasions, Petey has reluctantly played soccer on his mother's insistence. His lack of athletic skill and social awkwardness has resulted in multiple out-of-body experiences.

== Books ==
The first book collection of Cul de Sac strips, Cul de Sac: This Exit, was published September 1, 2008 by Andrews McMeel Publishing. It includes the pre-syndication The Washington Post strips in color, as well as a foreword by Bill Watterson (Calvin and Hobbes), who praised Thompson's work:

I thought the best newspaper comic strips were long gone, and I've never been happier to be wrong. Richard Thompson's Cul de Sac has it all—intelligence, gentle humor, a delightful way with words, and, most surprising of all, wonderful, wonderful drawings. Cul de Sac's whimsical take on the world and playful sense of language somehow gets funnier the more times you read it. Four-year-old Alice and her Blisshaven Preschool classmates will ring true to any parent. Doing projects in a cloud of glue and glitter, the little kids manage to reinterpret an otherwise incomprehensible world via their meandering, nonstop chatter. But I think my favorite character is Alice's older brother, Petey. A haunted, controlling milquetoast, he's surely one of the most neurotic kids to appear in comics. These children and their struggles are presented affectionately, and one of the things I like best about Cul de Sac is its natural warmth. Cul de Sac avoids both mawkishness and cynicism and instead finds genuine charm in its loopy appreciation of small events. Very few strips can hit this subtle note.

A second collection, Children at Play: A Cul de Sac Collection, was published in 2009 by Andrews McMeel. It features a foreword by writer-artist Mo Willems. A treasury book, Cul de Sac Golden Treasury: A Keepsake Garland of Classics, was published July 6, 2010 by Andrews McMeel. It features strips from the previous two book collections along with the early strips from the original run in The Washington Post. The book also features captions with additional insight or commentary written by Thompson himself. Writer Charles Solomon praised the new book in his review for the Los Angeles Times, stating "Cul de Sac proves the comic strip remains a viable art form while bucking current trends".

A third book of strip reprints, titled Shapes & Colors: A Cul de Sac Collection, was released on December 14, 2010. A fourth, The Mighty Alice, was released May 8, 2012. This collection features both the daily strips and Sunday installments in color. After the strip's run ended, a two-volume book collecting the entire run of the strip and selections of early The Washington Post strips, The Complete Cul de Sac, was released on May 6, 2014.

== Cul de Sac animated ==
A series of Cul de Sac animated shorts, produced by RingTales, are hosted by Babelgum. These shorts are 30-second to minute-long animated versions of the comic strips. Thompson's wife provides the voice of Madeline Otterloop, Alice and Petey's mother. Thompson has said that one of the kids is voiced by an adult.
