= Young Men's Preparatory Academy =

School in Florida, United States

Coordinates: 25°48′18″N 80°11′56″W

Information
- Grades: 6-12
- Gender: Boys

Young Men's Preparatory Academy is a public, single-gender preparatory school located in Miami, Florida, United States. It is a part of Miami-Dade County Public Schools (MDCPS), and serves grades 6–12. It has a leadership curriculum based on The 7 Habits of Highly Effective Teens.

Laura Isensee and Michael Vasquez of the Miami Herald described the goal of the school as "to hone boys into young men, ready for college." Initially the school only had high school grades, but because Young Women's Preparatory Academy was a 6-12 school, the YMPA administration later decided to expand the school. In 2012 the sixth grade was added, and middle school grades were subsequently included.

== Operations ==
The school uniforms of Young Men's Preparatory Academy have and include: brown or black-colored shoes, khaki pants, light blue, logo dress shirt (whether short sleeved or long sleeved), red, school logo tie, and a school logo blazer.

The school does not offer athletics.

MDCPS does not provide transportation to and from this school.

== Academic performance ==
As of 2012, over 90% of its graduates had been accepted to colleges and universities.

== Student body ==
As of 2012 there were over 140 students, an enrollment Isensee and Vasquez attributed to the lack of athletics and transportation and the difficulty of recruiting boys; they characterized the enrollment number as low in number. Then principal Leonard Ruan stated in 2012 that the boys at the school were more likely to take risks in regards to gaining leadership and school-related positions compared to boys at coeducational schools.
