= The 8th Habit =

2004 book by Stephen R. Covey

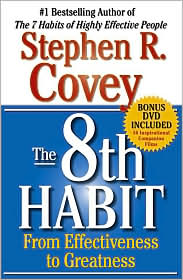
- Author: Stephen R. Covey
- Subject: Self-help books
- Genre: Non-fiction
- Published: 2004 (Free Press)
- ISBN: 0-7432-8793-2; 29 Nov 2005 reprint
- OCLC: 56592349
- LC Class: BF637.S4 C685 2005
- Preceded by: The Seven Habits of Highly Effective People

The 8th Habit: From Effectiveness to Greatness is a book written by Stephen R. Covey, published in 2004. It is the sequel to The Seven Habits of Highly Effective People, first published in 1989. The book clarifies and reinforces Covey's earlier declaration that "interdependence is a higher value than independence." This book helps its readers increase the dependence of themselves and others.

== Contents ==
The eighth habit is Find your voice and inspire others to find theirs. Voice is Covey's code for "unique personal significance". Those who inspire others to find theirs are the leaders needed now and for the future, according to Covey.

The book is divided into two sections, with the first few chapters focusing on finding your voice, while the later chapters are about inspiring others to find their voice. Some versions of the book come with a DVD, although all the short films on this DVD can be viewed via Covey's website. Most of the chapters in the book include a section discussing one of the 'stories' from the DVD, which are intended to illustrate the theme of the chapter (for example the story of Helen Keller and another about the Berlin Wall).

The book talks of "5 Cancerous Behaviors" (page 135) that inhibit people's greatness:

- Criticism
- Complaining
- Comparing
- Competing
- Contending

People can discover their voice because of the three gifts everyone is born with:

1. The freedom to choose
2. The natural laws or principles – those that dictate the consequences of behavior. Positive consequences come from fairness, kindness, respect, honesty, integrity, service, and contribution
3. The four bits of intelligence – mental, physical, emotional, and spiritual.

Covey talks about great achievers expressing their voice through the use of their intelligence. Achievers for example

- develop their mental energy into vision
- develop their physical energy into discipline
- develop their emotional energy into passion
- develop their spiritual energy into conscience – their inward moral sense of what is right and wrong and their drive towards meaning and contribution.
