= The 3rd Alternative =

2011 book by Stephen Covey

- Author: Stephen R. Covey
- Language: English
- Subject: Self-help, Negotiation
- Genre: non-fiction
- Published: 2011 Free Press
- Publication place: United States
- Media type: Print (Hardcover, Paperback)
- Pages: 456
- ISBN: 978-1-4516-2626-1; 978-1-4516-2628-5 (ebook)
- OCLC: 709673139
- Dewey Decimal: 158 23
- LC Class: BF449 .C68 2011

The 3rd Alternative: Solving Life's Most Difficult Problems, published in 2011, is a self-help book by Stephen Covey, also the author of The Seven Habits of Highly Effective People. In it, he takes a more detailed look at habit six from that book, "synergize". Co-author Breck England stated that The 7 Habits of Highly Effective People leads up to The 3rd Alternative. The book focuses on a process of conflict resolution that Covey said is distinct from compromise. It gives details and real-world examples and ends with two chapters explaining that the 3rd Alternative is "a way of life".

== Summary ==
The 3rd Alternative thinking involves applying four paradigms: "I See Myself", "I See You", "I Seek You Out", and "I Synergize With You".

The first step or paradigm is about coming to know oneself. It is about stepping outside of normal associations and examining personal worth, feelings, and interests. When a person adopts this paradigm and wins the "private victory," he or she is ready to turn toward others, according to Covey's 7 Habits. The second paradigm instructs readers to see others with the same respectfulness as they now see themselves. The next step is to understand others and their views. In this paradigm, interests are not obstacles to each other, but principles required to be understood by both parties involved in order to generate a solution for both. Covey said that, of the seven habits of his book, the one that has had the greatest impact for him is "Seek First to Understand, then to be Understood". The 3rd Alternative, he said, explores this topic, primarily in the section covering this third paradigm, "I Seek You Out". The final and most lengthy section describes the process of arriving at synergy. It involves four steps: "Ask the 3rd Alternative Question", "Define Criteria of Success", "Create 3rd Alternatives", and "Arrive at Synergy".

Following the exposition of the process, the authors include several chapters showing how The 3rd Alternative principles have been or could be applied in situations including work, home, school, law, society, and the world. Covey finishes the book by explaining that beyond using 3rd Alternative processes, one might try to live a 3rd Alternative life. He gives his personal insights into how this is done. Covey has explained that, when engaged in a negotiation or confronted with a problem, most people are not aware that a 3rd Alternative even exists.

== Reception ==
- Publishers Weekly
- Reuters
- The Cordoba Initiative
