= The 7 Habits of Highly Effective Teens =

1998 book by Sean Covey

- Author: Sean Covey
- Language: English
- Genre: Self-help
- Published: October 9, 1998 (Touchstone Books)
- Media type: Print
- Pages: 288
- ISBN: 9780684856094

The Seven Habits of Highly Effective Teens is a 1998 bestselling self-help book written by Sean Covey, the son of Stephen Covey. The book was published on October 9, 1998 through Touchstone Books and is largely based on The Seven Habits of Highly Effective People. In 1999, Covey released a companion book entitled Daily Reflections For Highly Effective Teens.

In 2000, The 7 Habits of Highly Effective Teens was named by the Young Adult Library Services Association as a "Popular Paperbacks for Young Adults".

== Synopsis ==
In the book, Covey discusses how teenagers can become more independent and effective by following seven basic habits. The habits range from being proactive in all aspects of one's life to planning and prioritizing one's daily life and responsibilities.

== Reception ==
Reception for the book has been positive, with some schools including the text in their lesson plans. A reviewer for the New Straits Times commented that the book's writing was "fun and lively" and called it a "fruitful read". AudioFile gave the audiobook a positive review, citing Covey's narration as a highlight. The 7 Habits of Highly Effective Teens has also been praised by several psychologists, although according to the Handbook of Self-Help Therapies the book has not been thoroughly tested as a part of a treatment plan.
