= First Things First (book) =

1994 book by Stephen Covey

- Author: Stephen Covey; A. Roger Merrill; Rebecca R. Merrill.
- Genre: Self-help
- ISBN: 978-0743468596

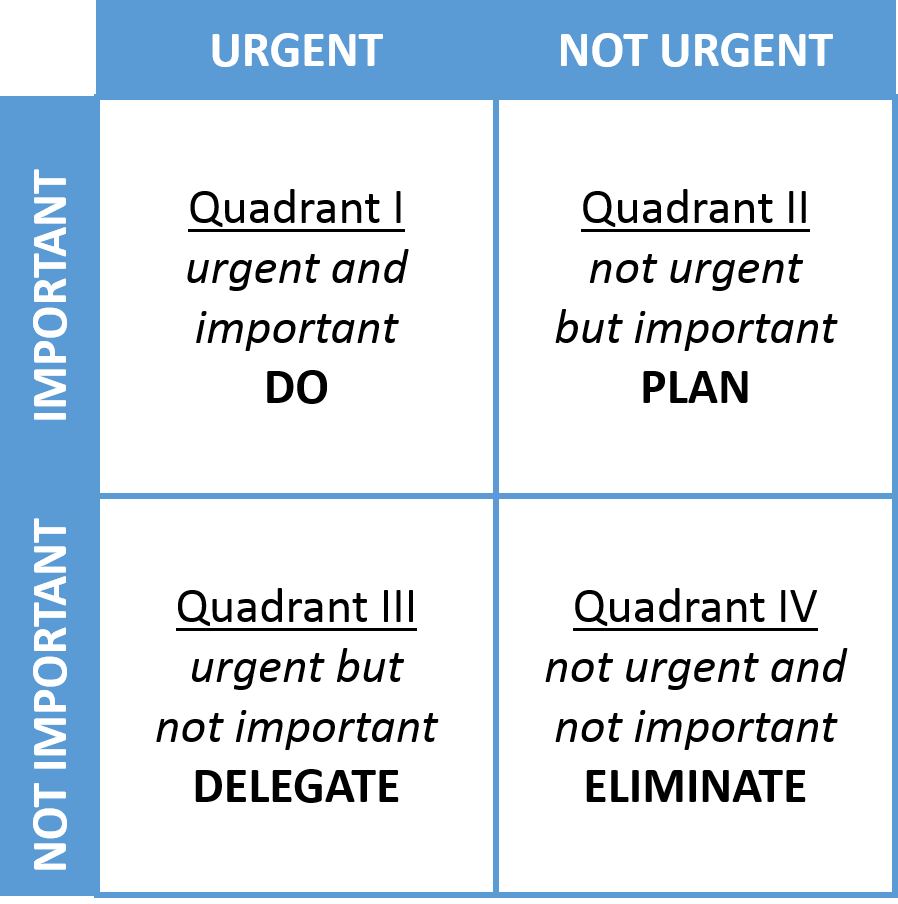
The four-quadrant "Eisenhower Decision Matrix" for importance vs. urgency

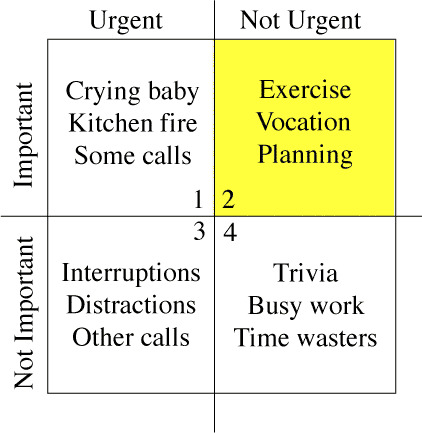
An example of the four-quadrant matrix, filled out

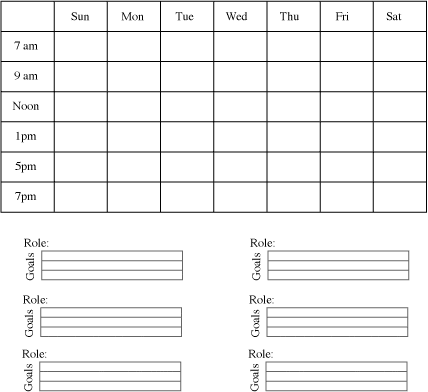
A weekly worksheet to identify roles and plan important activities before filling in entire schedule

First Things First, sub-titled To Live, to Love, to Learn, to Leave a Legacy, (1994) is a self-help book written by Stephen Covey, A. Roger Merrill, and Rebecca R. Merrill.

It offers a time management approach that, if established as a habit, is intended to help readers achieve "effectiveness" by aligning themselves to "First Things". The approach is a further development of the approach popularized in Covey's The Seven Habits of Highly Effective People and other titles.

== Summary ==
The book asserts that there are three generations of time management: first-generation task lists, second-generation personal organizers with deadlines, and third-generation values clarification as incorporated in the Franklin Planner. Using the analogy of "the clock and the compass", the authors assert that identifying primary roles and principles provides a "true north" and reference when deciding what activities are most important, so that decisions are guided not merely by the "clock" of scheduling but by the "compass" of purpose and values. Asserting that people have a need "to live, to love, to learn, and to leave a legacy" they propose moving beyond "urgency".

In the book, Covey describes a framework for prioritizing work that is aimed at long-term goals, at the expense of tasks that appear to be urgent, but are in fact less important. He uses a time management formulation attributed to Dwight D. Eisenhower (see: The Eisenhower Method), categorizing tasks into whether they are urgent and whether they are important, recognizing that important tasks may not be urgent, and urgent tasks are not necessarily important. This is his 2x2 matrix: classifying tasks as urgent and non-urgent on one axis, and important or non-important on the other axis. His quadrant 2 (not the same as the quadrant II in a Cartesian coordinate system) has the items that are non-urgent but important. These are the ones he believes people are likely to neglect, but should focus on to achieve effectiveness.

Important items are identified by focusing on a few key priorities and roles which will vary from person to person, then identifying small goals for each role each week, in order to maintain a holistic life balance. One tool for this is a worksheet that lists up to seven key roles, with three weekly goals per role, to be evaluated and scheduled into each week before other appointments occupy all available time with things that seem urgent but are not important. This concept is illustrated with a story that encourages people to "place the big rocks first".

Delegation is presented as an important part of time management. Successful delegation, according to Covey, focuses on results and benchmarks that are to be agreed upon in advance, rather than on prescribing detailed work plans.
