= Richard Thompson (cartoonist) =

American illustrator and cartoonist

- Self-portrait
- Born: Richard Church Thompson; October 8, 1957 Baltimore, Maryland
- Died: July 27, 2016 (aged 58) Arlington, Virginia
- Areas: Writer, Penciller, Artist, Inker, Letterer, Colourist
- Notable works: Cul de Sac
- Awards: Will Eisner Hall of Fame

Richard Thompson's Cul de Sac (October 7, 2007)

Richard Church Thompson (October 8, 1957 – July 27, 2016) was an American illustrator and cartoonist best known for his syndicated comic strip Cul de Sac and the illustrated poem "Make the Pie Higher". He was given the Reuben Award for Outstanding Cartoonist of the Year for 2010.

== Cul de Sac ==
In 1982 Thompson began working at the Washington Post, and he was the newspaper's unofficial staff artist by 1985. Thompson provided illustrations for Joel Achenbach's Washington Post column and Gene Weingarten's column in The Washington Post Magazine.

The weekly, watercolored incarnation of his comic Cul de Sac launched in The Washington Post Magazine on February 14, 2004. The strip focuses on a four-year-old girl, Alice Otterloop, and her daily life at preschool and at home. It was published in more than 70 newspapers by the fall of 2007. It was distributed nationally as both a daily and Sunday strip by Universal Press Syndicate.

The first book collection of Cul de Sac strips, published in 2008 by Andrews McMeel, includes the pre-syndication Washington Post strips in color, as well as a foreword by Bill Watterson, who praised Thompson's work:

I thought the best newspaper comic strips were long gone, and I've never been happier to be wrong. Richard Thompson's Cul de Sac has it all—intelligence, gentle humor, a delightful way with words, and, most surprising of all, wonderful, wonderful drawings. Cul de Sac's whimsical take on the world and playful sense of language somehow gets funnier the more times you read it. Four-year-old Alice and her Blisshaven Preschool classmates will ring true to any parent. Doing projects in a cloud of glue and glitter, the little kids manage to reinterpret an otherwise incomprehensible world via their meandering, nonstop chatter. But I think my favorite character is Alice's older brother, Petey. A haunted, controlling milquetoast, he's surely one of the most neurotic kids to appear in comics. These children and their struggles are presented affectionately, and one of the things I like best about Cul de Sac is its natural warmth. Cul de Sac avoids both mawkishness and cynicism and instead finds genuine charm in its loopy appreciation of small events. Very few strips can hit this subtle note.

In 2009, Andrews McMeel published a second Cul de Sac collection, Children at Play, featuring a foreword by Mo Willems.

== Richard's Poor Almanac ==
Thompson's cartoon series Richard's Poor Almanac appeared weekly (usually on Saturdays) in the Washington Post Style section. A compendium of his Richard's Poor Almanac cartoons was published by Emmis Books in 2005.

The Richard's Poor Almanac cartoon published the week of George W. Bush's first inauguration included a mock inaugural poem, "Make the Pie Higher," composed of some of Bush's more incoherent quotations, or "Bushisms". When "Make the Pie Higher" was leaked onto the Internet, it spread rapidly and was eventually dissected and analyzed on Snopes.com, which did a lengthy review of its origins. The poem has been set to music at least five times in various styles, including Irish and choral music.

== Illustrations ==
Thompson's illustrations have appeared in U.S. News & World Report, The New Yorker, Air & Space/Smithsonian, National Geographic and The Atlantic Monthly.

In 2004, Thompson illustrated Francis Heaney's Holy Tango of Literature. In 2010, he wrote and illustrated "Barney Google and the Bigfoot Style", the foreword for Craig Yoe's Barney Google: Gambling, Horse Races & High-Toned Women (Yoe Books/IDW, 2010).

In 2010, the Pixar director Pete Docter hired Thompson to work on character sketches and development for his upcoming movie Inside Out.

In 2014, the Billy Ireland Cartoon Library & Museum at Ohio State University hosted an exhibition of Thompson's work: "The Irresistible Force Meets the Immovable Object: A Richard Thompson Retrospective".

== Awards ==
- 1989: A Gold and a Silver Funny Bone Award from the Society of Illustrators for humorous illustration
- 1995: The National Cartoonists Society's awards for both the Magazine and Book Illustration division and for Newspaper Illustration
- 2004: The Milton F. "Sonny" Clogg Outstanding Alumni Achievement Award from Montgomery College
- 2011: The Reuben Award for Outstanding Cartoonist of the Year, presented by the National Cartoonists Society
- 2012: The Harvey Award for Best Syndicated Comic Strip
- 2012: The first ever Ignatz "Golden Brick Award" for lifetime achievement
- 2015: The Eisner Award for Best Humor Publication for The Complete Cul de Sac

== Personal life ==
Thompson was a long-time resident of Arlington, Virginia.

On July 16, 2009, Thompson announced that he had been diagnosed with Parkinson's disease, a problem he described as "a pain in the fundament", which slowed him down but did not affect his drawing hand. Stephan Pastis, creator of Pearls Before Swine, described Thompson as "probably the most talented all-around syndicated cartoonist working today" and praised the courage and optimism he showed in revealing his illness.

The children's book illustrator Stacy Curtis became the inker of Cul de Sac on March 26, 2012; but by August the effects of Parkinson's were progressing, and Thompson announced that he would be ending Cul de Sac: "Parkinson's disease is horribly selfish and demanding. A daily comic strip is too and I can only deal with one at a time. So it was a long, gradual, sudden decision."

In 2012, the book Team Cul de Sac: Cartoonists Draw the Line at Parkinson's was published. It was created by his close friend Chris Sparks to honor Richard. It features the work of Bill Watterson and other cartoonists, who rallied together to raise money to benefit Team Fox, the fundraising arm of the Michael J. Fox Foundation that is working to find a cure for Parkinson's disease.

In 2014, Watterson, Nick Galifianakis and David Apatoff published a collection of Thompson's artwork and illustrations: The Art of Richard Thompson. A short documentary of the same name, profiling Thompson and his work, was also produced that year, directed by Bob Burnett.

In June 2016 Encore Stage & Studios in Arlington, Virginia, premiered the play Cul de Sac by Amy Thompson — Richard's wife — based on his comic strip.

Thompson died on July 27, 2016, from complications of Parkinson's disease.

== Bibliography ==
- Richard's Poor Almanac: 12 Months of Misinformation in Handy Cartoon Form (2004)
- Holy Tango of Literature (2004)
- Cul de Sac (2008)
- Children at Play: A Cul de Sac Collection (2009)
- Cul de Sac Golden Treasury: A Keepsake Garland of Classics (2010)
- Shapes & Colors: A Cul de Sac Collection (2010)
- The Mighty Alice: A Cul de Sac Collection (2012)
- The Complete Cul de Sac (2014)
- The Art of Richard Thompson (2014)
- The Incomplete Art of Why Things Are (The Richard Thompson Library) (Volume 1) (2017)
