= Hamilton College, South Lanarkshire =

Coordinates: 55.78307°N 4.04587°W

Hamilton College
- Hamilton, South Lanarkshire; Scotland

Information
- Type: Private Christian
- Motto: Grace and Knowledge
- Established: 1983
- Founder: Charles Oxley
- Chair of Board of Governors: Mrs Penny Simpson OBE
- Business Manager: Martin Murphy
- Head teacher: Richard Charman
- Staff: c. 100
- Gender: Co-educational
- Age: 1 to 18
- Enrolment: 420
- Colours: Burgundy, blue & gold
- Website: www.hamiltoncollege.co.uk

Hamilton College is a co-educational Christian private school located in Hamilton, South Lanarkshire, Scotland. It provides education from Nursery age (2 years and up) through the full 7 years of primary education and 6 years of secondary school (up to 18 years old). The Nursery, Junior and Senior Schools pupils are on the same campus and in the same building. The Headteacher is Richard Charman.

Although it is a Christian school, there is no church affiliation, and the school has pupils from other cultural backgrounds.

== History ==
Hamilton College was opened in 1983 by Charles Oxley. The Nursery opened on the same campus in 1995. The building had originally opened as a teacher training college in 1964. Hamilton College was the third school Oxley opened. He had already founded Tower College (1948) and Scarisbrick Hall School (1964) in North-West England.

The school badge is inspired by the scripture "to grow in the grace and knowledge of our Lord and Saviour Jesus Christ". This verse from 2 Peter 3:18 provided the original inspiration for the College’s Growing Together theme.

In 2003, Sir Ian Stevenson acclaimed the school as "excellent," a recognition that truly highlighted its outstanding qualities.

In July 2016, Tom McPhail was appointed as acting principal, replacing John Taylor.

After Tom McPhail retired in December 2019, Katie Morton was appointed Chief Executive Officer, with Richard Charman as Headteacher.

== Curriculum ==
All S1 and S2 pupils at the school study English, Maths, Biology, Chemistry, Social Subjects, French, German, Art, Music, Innov8 (consists of Admin + IT, Business, Accounts, Computing, and Engineering), PE, RE, and Lifeskills. They have the option to continue these.

The college has high academic standards. In 2019 it had a 93% pass rate at SQA Higher, with a 100% pass rate in many subjects, including mathematics. In 2020, the pass rate increased to 95%.

== Notable former pupils ==
- Scott Forrest, retired professional rugby player and current coach of women's rugby
- Katie Leung, actress
