= Tower College =

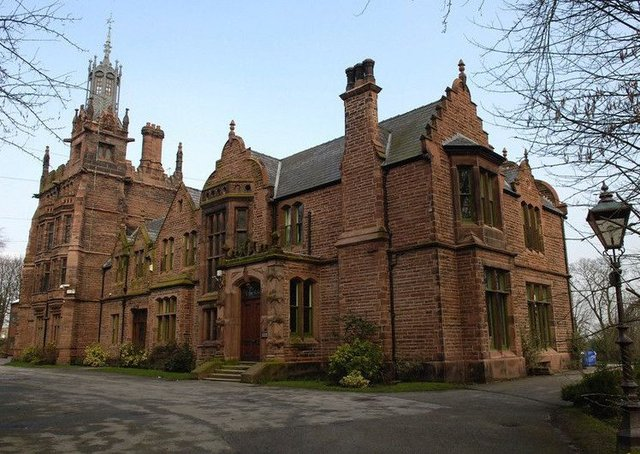
- ‘The Tower’

Location
- Mill Lane; Rainhill, L35 6NE; England; 53.4069225°N 2.7584481°W

Information
- Type: Independent Day School
- Motto: Labore et Honore
- Established: 1948
- Founder: Charles Oxley
- Local authority: St Helens
- Principal: Andrea Bingley
- Gender: Coeducational
- Age: 3 to 16
- Website: towercollege.com

Tower College is an English independent non-denominational Christian school for boys and girls aged 3–16.

== History ==
The school is named after the main school building, the former private residence, The Tower, on Mill Lane, Rainhill near Prescot, Merseyside.

Designed in free Jacobethan style and built in 1880 for the Henry Baxter family, the main building’s exterior features balustrades, parapets, and high Elizabethan style chimneys. The interior has an main stair hall with stained glass windows and wood panelled rooms in Jacobean style with decorative ceilings. The Tower operated as a war hospital during World War I. In 2006, the main school building was considered for listed status, but the inspection found too many original features had been altered since its adaptation as a hospital and school.

Charles and Muriel Oxley bought The Tower and established the school in 1948. While continuing to operate Tower College, Oxley later established two other schools, Scarisbrick Hall School, near Ormskirk in 1963, and Hamilton College, in Lanarkshire in 1983. After Charles and Muriel Oxley died, their daughter Rachel Oxley became Principal. As of 2024, Tower College’s principal is Andrea Bingley.

== Curriculum ==
The school has a broad curriculum covering all major subjects, together with specialist sports, music and languages. Extracurricular activities include choir, instrument ensembles, performing arts and sports. Exam results at Tower College are often above the local and national averages.

== Reputation ==
Tower College aims to have clear communication with parents.

With the COVID-19 pandemic, the school invested in online learning where teachers offer live online lessons and a ‘virtual exam hall’, where invigilation can be conducted by teachers via Zoom, a development widely reported in national media.

Aside from public examinations, students take part in competitive music, sports, and public speaking. Students take part in the Rotary Club of St. Helens public speaking competition and have represented the region in the ‘Youth Speaks’ competition.

Also known for charity fundraising, Tower College holds fundraising events throughout the school. This has included raising money for the local Willowbrook Hospice in Eccleston Park.
