= Vandana Singh =

Indian writer

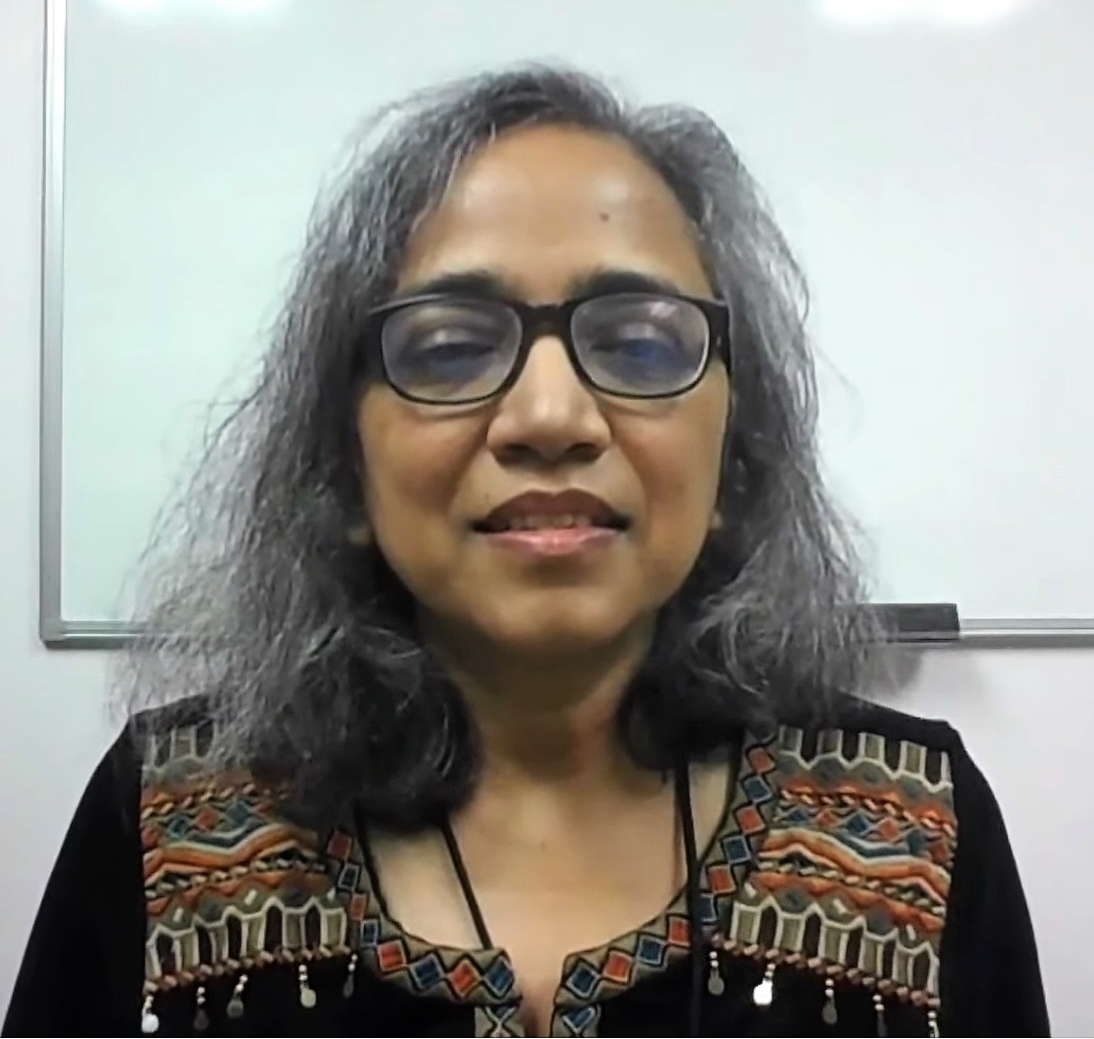
- Singh at a discussion for The British Library in 2021
- Born: New Delhi, India
- Occupations: Author, Particle physics professor
- Writing career
- Period: 2000s–present
- Genres: Fantasy, Science fiction, Children's Literature
- Notable works: "Delhi", "The Wife", Younguncle Comes to Town
- Website: vandana-writes.com [no longer active]

Vandana Singh is an Indian science fiction writer and physicist. She is a Professor of Physics and Environment at the Department of Environment, Society and Sustainability at Framingham State University in Massachusetts. Singh also serves on the Advisory Council of METI (Messaging Extraterrestrial Intelligence).

== Works ==
=== Collected stories ===
- Ambiguity Machines and other stories (2018) (ISBN 9781618731432) includes the previously unpublished story "Requiem"
- The Woman Who Thought She Was A Planet and other stories (2008) (ISBN 9788189884048) includes two previously unpublished stories: "Conservation Laws" and "Infinities"

=== Short fiction ===
- "The Room on the Roof" in the anthology Polyphony (2002)
- "The Woman Who Thought She Was a Planet" in the anthology Trampoline (ISBN 9781931520041) (2003)
- "The Wife" in the anthology Polyphony (Volume 3)

Collected in Year's Best Fantasy and Horror (17)

- "Three Tales from Sky River: Myths for a Starfaring Age" in Strange Horizons (2004)

Honorable mention in Year's Best Science Fiction (22) and Year's Best Fantasy and Horror (18)

- "Delhi" in the anthology So Long Been Dreaming (May 2004)

Collected in Year's Best Science Fiction (22)

- "Thirst" in The 3rd Alternative (Winter 2004)

Longlisted for the British Fantasy Award
Honorable mention for Year's Best Science Fiction (22) and Year's Best Fantasy and Horror (18)
Collected in the anthology The Inner Line: Stories by Indian Women (2006)

- "The Tetrahedron" in InterNova (2005)

Shortlisted for the Carl Brandon Parallax Award
Honorable mention in Year's Best Science Fiction (23)

- "The Sign in the Window" in the chapbook series Rabid Transit (May 2005)
- "Hunger" in the anthology Interfictions (April 2007)
- "Life-pod" in Foundation - The International Review of Science Fiction (August 2007)
- "Of Love and Other Monsters," a novella published in the Aqueduct Press's Conversation Pieces Series (October 2007)
- "Oblivion: A Journey" in the anthology Clockwork Phoenix (Summer 2008)

Collected in Year's Best SF 14

=== Children's fiction ===
- Younguncle Comes to Town (2004)
- Younguncle in the Himalayas (2005)

=== Poetry ===
- "A Portrait of the Artist" in Strange Horizons (2003)

Awarded second place in the 2004 Rhysling Awards for speculative poetry (long poem category)

- "Syllables of Old Lore" in the anthology Mythic (2006)
- "The Choices of Leaves" in the anthology Mythic (2006)

== Sources ==
- "Younguncle comes to town". The Hindu. 7 January 2005. Archived from the original on 2 November 2012.
- "First Look: Literature". Tehelka. 15 December 2007.
- "In the Himalayas". The Hindu. 26 August 2005. Archived from the original on 8 November 2005.
- "Fantasy seeker". The Hindu. 13 February 2005. Archived from the original on 16 February 2005.
- "Normal, boring". The Telegraph. 2 January 2008.
- "In cyber world". The Hindu. 22 February 2008. Archived from the original on 27 February 2008.
- "Notes on Indian Science Fiction: The Parallel Worlds of Jayant Narlikar and Vandana Singh". Mithila Review. 4 May 2016.
