= Scarisbrick Hall School =

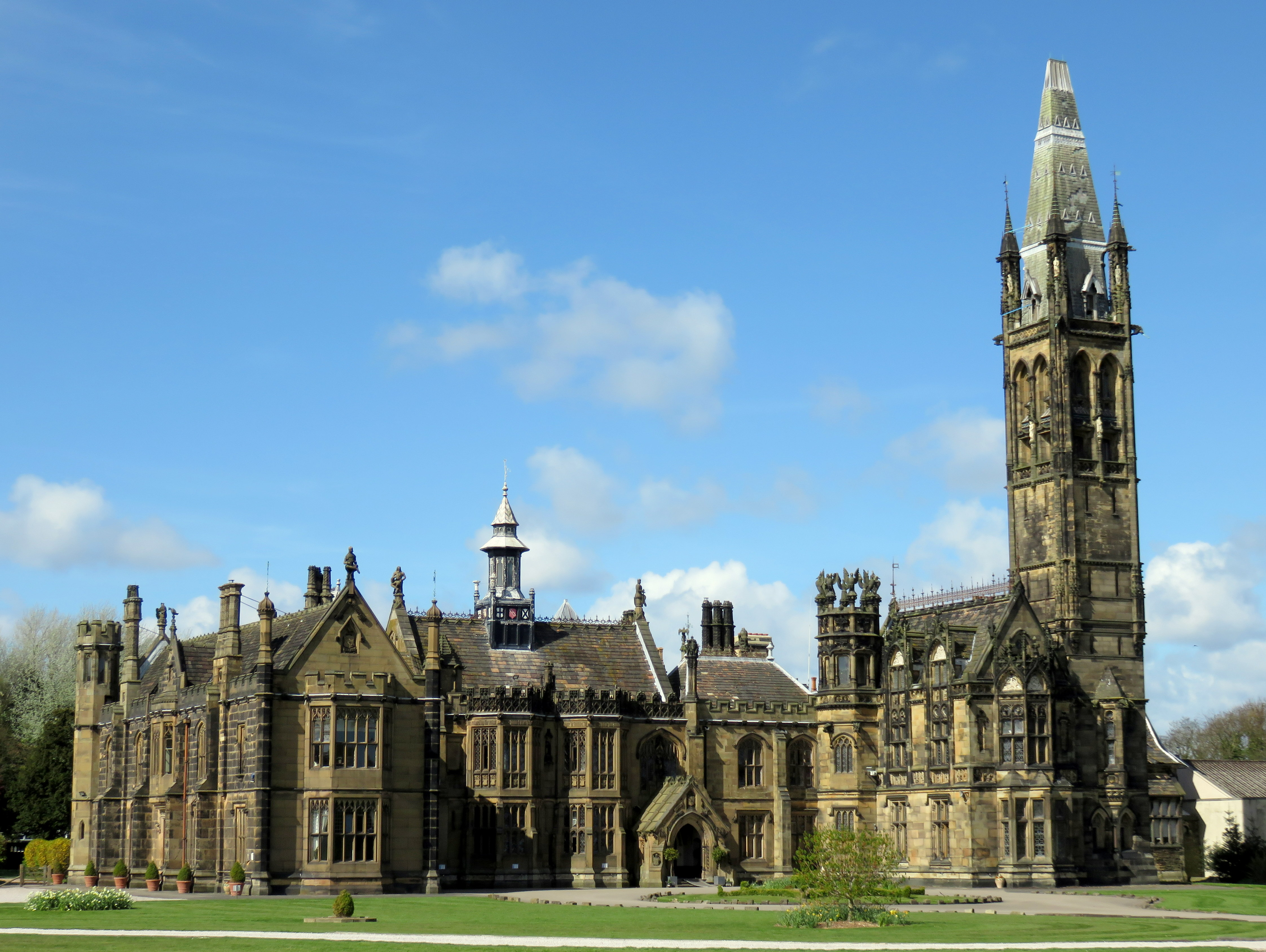

Location
- Scarisbrick, Lancashire, L40 9RQ; England; 53.6064°N 2.9208°W

Information
- Type: Independent day school
- Established: 1964
- Founder: Charles Oxley
- Local authority: Lancashire
- Department for Education URN: 119824 Tables
- Managing Director: Michael Headley
- Headmaster: Jeff Shaw
- Gender: Mixed
- Age: 3 to 18
- Houses: Oxley (red), Headley (yellow), Pugin (green), Raynor (blue).
- Colours: Red, green, gold
- Website: http://www.scarisbrickhallschool.co.uk/

Scarisbrick Hall School is a mixed private school, located in Scarisbrick Hall, Lancashire, England, that educates children from nursery to age 18.

== History ==
Scarisbrick Hall is a 150-room mansion built between 1830 and 1860 by the architect Augustus Pugin, who also worked on the Palace of Westminster.

The Scarisbrick family lived on this site from 1238 to 1946. The Hall is an example of residential Gothic renaissance architecture and is a Grade I listed building of special architectural interest. The 75 ft tower (which was the blueprint for Big Ben), was recently restored, along with other areas of the hall in a £7m project. Within the Chapel of St Mary Undercroft are a set of Pugin chairs, originally designed for Charles Scarisbrick, and purchased for the Palace of Westminster in 1951.

Scarisbrick Park is an extensive private estate listed at Grade II on the Register of Historic Parks and Gardens.

Scarisbrick Hall has been the home of an independent school since 1964. Named 'Scarisbrick Hall School', the Founder and Principal was Charles Oxley, who had already established his first independent school - Tower College - in 1948, and went on to establish a third - Hamilton College - in 1983.

A number of years after Oxley’s death, the school was sold, and between 1998 and 2009 was renamed Kingswood College at Scarisbrick Hall. Upon threat of closure, Kingswood College was bought by a local family in August 2009, who changed the name of the school back to Scarisbrick Hall School.

In September 2009 the Scarisbrick Hall Group acquired the business of operating Kingswood College Trust. In 2014, the opening of a sixth form college on the site was announced. The college opened in September 2015 and is now owned by the Headley Family.

== Curriculum ==
Scarisbrick Hall School is organised into five departments: Nursery; First School; Middle School; College; and Sixth Form.

The ‘Beautiful Beginnings’ Nursery department provides an early childhood education for students.

The First and Middle Schools has a curriculum which includes PSHE, critical thinking, business and languages as well as educational trips, art, music, drama, a choir, instrument ensembles and academic clubs to take part in.

The curriculum in Scarisbrick Hall College department is delivered through five faculty areas (English, Mathematics, Humanities and Languages, Performance, Sciences). These faculty areas cover the core knowledge required for students to progress.

The Scarisbrick Hall School Sixth Form offers a variety of A level subjects and BTEC courses. A level results in 2020 were top of the table for the whole of the Lancashire Education Authority area and the department sends 80% of its students on to prestigious Russell Group universities.

== Reputation ==
In 2017, the A level pass rate was 100%, while GCSEs were passed at a rate of 96% overall and 100% across 13 different subjects, with nearly half of the grades at grades A*/A. In English and Science there was a 100% pass rate (A*- C, 9 – 4), with nearly 90% of English grades at A*- B and 42% A*/A.

In 2019, there was an overall A level pass rate of 100%, with 48.48% of those passes at grades A* - A, while GCSE results saw an overall pass rate of 95%, with 34.38% of passes at grades A* - A.

== Alumni ==
- Tommy Fleetwood
- Simon Howard
- Nisha Katona

== Inspections ==
The report by the Independent Schools Inspectorate (ISI) - ‘Regulatory Compliance 2018’

2018 Main Findings:

- Quality & Standards of EYFS - Outstanding
- Effectiveness of Leadership & Management - Outstanding
- Quality of Teaching, Learning & Assessment - Outstanding
- Personal Behaviour, Development & Welfare - Outstanding
- Outcomes for Children - Outstanding
