= Charles Oxley =

Christian activist and educationalist

Charles Oxley (1922–1987) was a British Christian activist and educationalist.

== Establishment of three Independent Schools ==
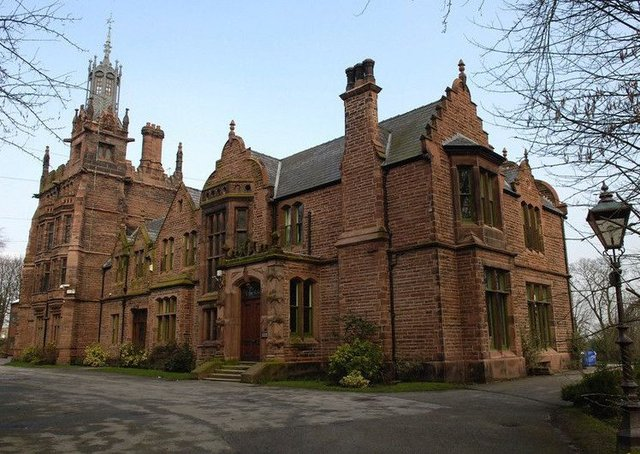
Tower College

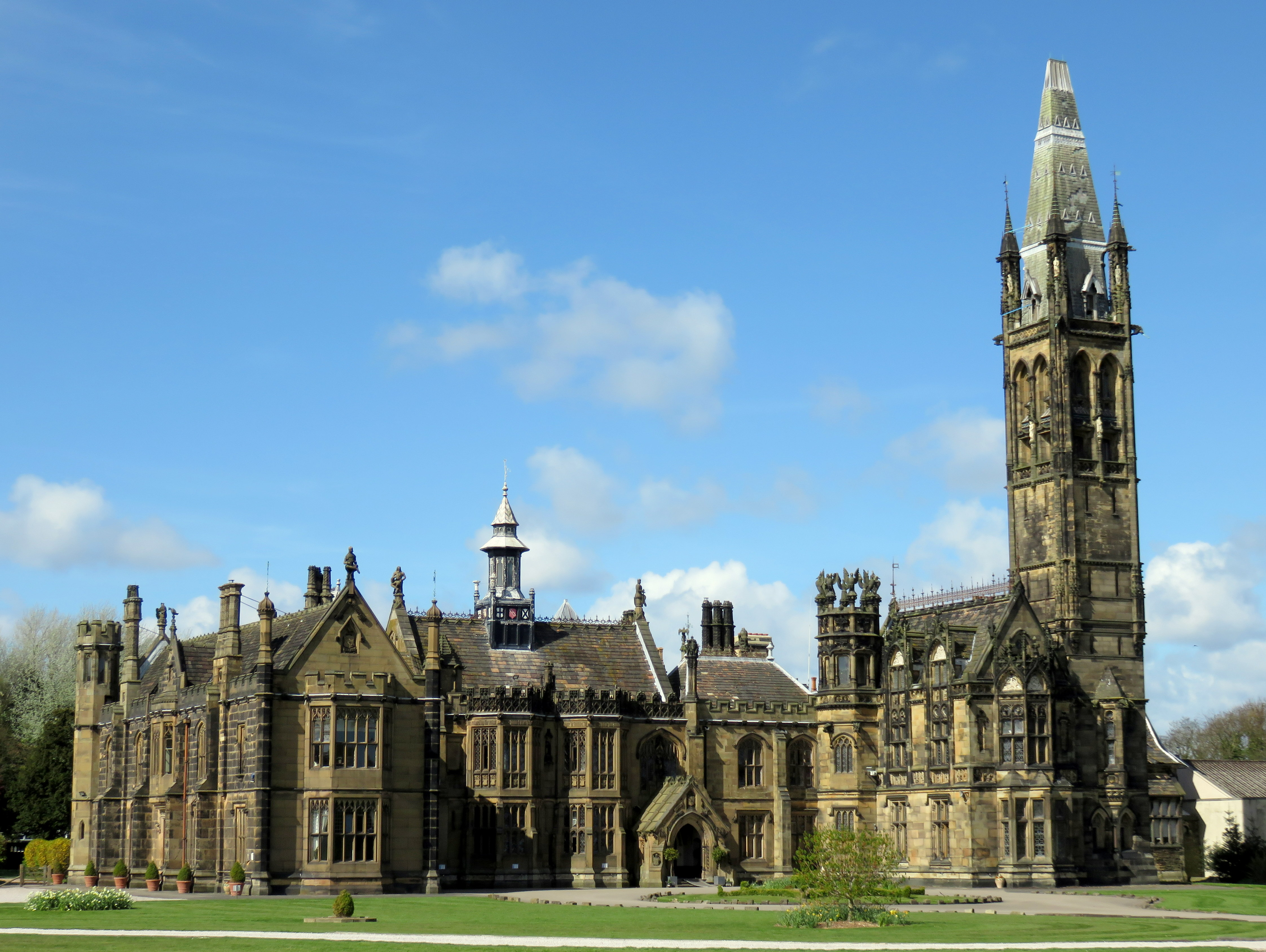
Scarisbrick Hall

Oxley established three non-denominational Christian independent schools and was a campaigner on educational and moral issues. On returning from teaching in Egypt, together with his wife Muriel, Oxley opened Tower College in 1948 after purchasing 'The Tower' in Mill Lane in the village of Rainhill near Prescot. He went on to establish Scarisbrick Hall School in 1964 and Hamilton College in 1983.

== Halkyn Castle ==
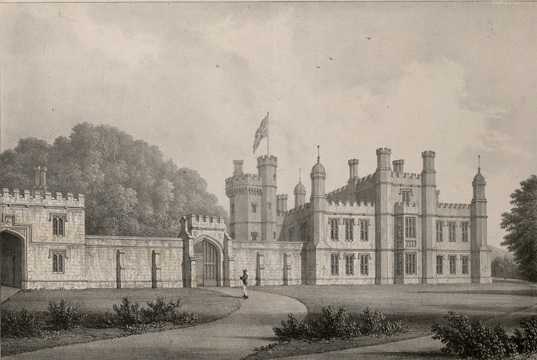
Halkyn Castle

Designed by the architect John Buckler and built between 1824 and 1827 for Robert Grosvenor, who was at the time the 2nd Earl Grosvenor, and later the 1st Marquess of Westminster, Halkyn Castle was a secondary residence and hunting lodge for the Grosvenor family. Oxley purchased the property in Flintshire, North Wales, with a view to establishing another independent school but planning permission was not granted. He therefore used the castle for school trips and charitable purposes.

== Liverpool Bible College ==
A devout Christian, Oxley also ran a bible college in the Toxteth area of Liverpool. At the time of the Toxteth riots, he stayed overnight at the premises to protect the building from any possible violence from the Toxteth rioters.

== Missionary Work in India ==
Oxley believed in propagating his Christian faith and made ten visits to India in support of Christian schools, orphanages and for missionary work.

== Legacy ==
Oxley died of cancer in the autumn of 1987.

Oxley established three Christian independent Schools.

He protested against sex shops in several northern towns, child abuse, pornography and blasphemy.

He was against the re-marriage of divorcees, and Chairman of the National Campaign for Law and Order. He campaigned for capital punishment to be re-introduced, citing his “Christian belief” as the reason for this. With regard to the Church of England, he believed it had been “infiltrated by atheistic humanism”.

== Infiltration of the Paedophile Information Exchange ==
Charles Oxley was friends with Mary Whitehouse and Vice President of her National Viewers and Listeners Association. What eventually became his most high profile fame was when, in 1983, he spied on the Paedophile Information Exchange, joining it under an assumed name.

In August 1983, Oxley handed over a dossier about the Paedophile Information Exchange to Scotland Yard, having supplied the authorities with inside information for a year. From this dossier, a special report was drawn up for Home Secretary Leon Brittan and led to criminal prosecutions. Oxley’s testimony at the Royal Courts of Justice led to three of its leaders going to prison.

This was first reported on 25 August 1983 in the Glasgow Herald. The Independent Inquiry into Child Sexual Abuse, published in 2020, focused on the Paedophile Information Exchange in part of their report, which covered the period 1974 to 1984, thus including the period that Oxley was spying on the group.
