= National Viewers' and Listeners' Association =

UK media standards pressure group

Mediawatch-UK
- Final version of the Mediawatch-UK logo
- Formation: 1965
- Dissolved: 2021
- Legal status: Non-profit organisation
- Purpose: Pressure group
- Region served: United Kingdom
- Director: Elizabeth Evenden-Kenyon

Mediawatch-UK, formerly known as the National Viewers' and Listeners' Association (National VALA or NVLA), was an advocacy group in the United Kingdom, which campaigned against the publication and broadcast of media content that it viewed as harmful, blasphemous and offensive, such as sex, violence, and profanity.

== History ==
NVLA was founded in 1965 by Mary Whitehouse to succeed the earlier Clean-Up TV Campaign, which Whitehouse co-founded with her husband Ernest and the Reverend Basil and Norah Buckland early in the previous year. NVLA Vice President was Christian activist and educationalist, Charles Oxley. Whitehouse remained the group's leader until 1994, when she was succeeded by John Beyer. NVLA changed its name to Mediawatch-UK in 2001.

Mediawatch-UK monitored traditional broadcast channels, as well as social and digital media, published reports about programme content, and responded to Government and other consultations on broadcasting and digital policy. It argued for greater parliamentary accountability in recognising and tackling the risks inherent in digital platforms. It also highlighted the need for both governments and individual households to be proactive, not just reactive, in monitoring risks online.

The organisation closed down and was dissolved as a company on 7 September 2021 following an application by three directors on 12 June of that year to strike the company off the Register.

== Campaigns ==
=== Pornography ===
Along with around 400 others Mediawatch-UK responded to a Home Office consultation concerning extreme pornography in December 2005. In the Mediawatch-UK response it was suggested that the possession of allegedly "hard-core" pornography, as currently classified R18 by the British Board of Film Classification and, therefore, legally sold in high street sex shops (R18 classification), should be included in the range of extreme pornography that is the subject of the Home Office consultation. It is proposed that possession of extreme material would become a criminal offence punishable by up to 3 years in prison.

Mediawatch-UK also responded to a Home Office consultation on the regulation of R18 videos, on a Department of Culture Media and Sport consultation on the future of the BBC, on the Office of Communications' Broadcasting Code and its Draft Annual Plan for 2006/7, on a House of Lords consultation on Religious Offences and much more.

In January 2012, Mediawatch-UK issued a condemnation of the outcome of the R v Peacock court case. The Metropolitan Police had accused the defendant, Michael Peacock, of selling gay BDSM pornographic DVDs which had the ability to "deprave and corrupt" the viewer, contravening the Obscene Publications Act 1959, but he was acquitted by a jury. Vivienne Pattison claimed that the case "illustrates the problem" with the law as it stood, noting that "There is not a list which says what is obscene and what is not. It makes it incredibly difficult to get a conviction on that". In response to the events of the trial she argued that while "As a society we are moving to a place where porn is considered as kind of fun between consenting adults," she felt that this was problematic because in her opinion "porn is damaging."

=== Violence ===
Mediawatch-UK criticised the Wii game MadWorld, stating that it was the "most violent video game ever to launch on the family-friendly Wii". John Beyer, director, stated that "This game sounds very unsavoury. I hope the British Board of Film Classification (BBFC) will view this with concern and decide it should not be granted a classification. What the rest of world does is up to them. We need to ensure that modern and civilised values take priority rather than killing and maiming people." MadWorld's publisher Sega stated that "MadWorld pushes the envelope with its extreme content but takes a step away from the dark and serious nature of most mature games." Nintendo also responded, saying that their Wii console "appeals to a wide range of audiences from children and teenagers to adult and senior citizens, anyone from 5 - 95, as such there is a wide range of content for all ages and tastes available. MadWorld will be suitably age rated through the appropriate legal channels and thus only available to an audience above the age rating it is given." and that "the game is not made by Nintendo but by Sega."
