= Richard's Poor Almanac =

Cartoon series by Richard Thompson

Book cover for a collected edition

Richard's Poor Almanac is a cartoon series by Richard Thompson which appeared weekly (usually on Saturdays) in The Washington Post Style section. It ran from 1997 to 2016.

== "Make the Pie Higher" ==
The 2001 "Make the Pie Higher" strip

The Richard's Poor Almanac cartoon published the week of George W. Bush's first inauguration was Thompson's mock inaugural poem, "Make the Pie Higher", composed of some of Bush's more incoherent quotations. When "Make the Pie Higher" was shared on the Internet, it spread rapidly and was eventually dissected and analyzed on Snopes, which published a lengthy review of its origins. The poem has been set to music multiple times in various styles, including Irish and choral music.
