= Stephen Covey =

American educator, author, businessman and motivational speaker (1932–2012)

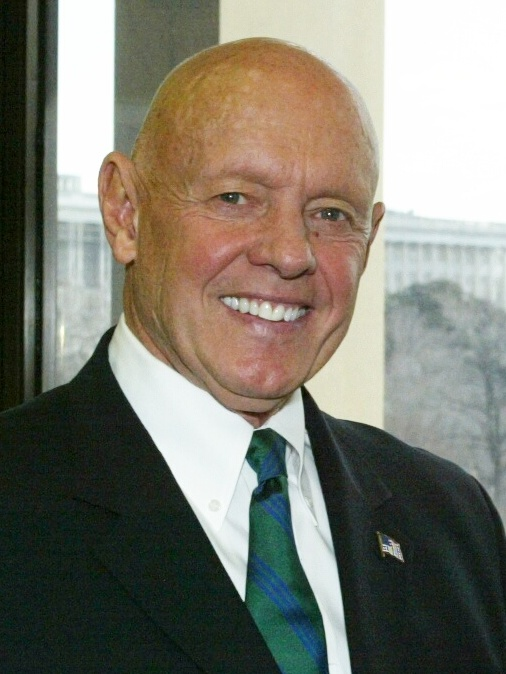
- Covey in 2005
- Born: Stephen Richards Covey; October 24, 1932; Salt Lake City, Utah, U.S.
- Died: July 16, 2012 (aged 79); Idaho Falls, Idaho, U.S.
- Education: University of Utah (B.S.); Harvard University (M.B.A.); Brigham Young University (D.R.E.)
- Occupations: Author, professional speaker, professor, consultant, management-expert
- Spouse: Sandra Covey
- Children: 9 (including Sean Covey, Stephen M. R. Covey)
- Website: stephencovey.com

Stephen Richards Covey (October 24, 1932 – July 16, 2012) was an American educator, author, businessman, and speaker. His most popular book is The 7 Habits of Highly Effective People. His other books include First Things First, Principle-Centered Leadership, The 7 Habits of Highly Effective Families, The 8th Habit, and The Leader In Me: How Schools and Parents Around the World Are Inspiring Greatness, One Child at a Time. In 1996, Time magazine named him one of the 25 most influential people. He was a professor at the Jon M. Huntsman School of Business at Utah State University (USU) at the time of his death.

== Early life and education ==
Covey was born to Stephen Glenn Covey and Irene Louise Richards Covey in Salt Lake City, Utah, on October 24, 1932. Louise was the daughter of Stephen L Richards, an apostle and counselor in the First Presidency of the Church of Jesus Christ of Latter-day Saints (LDS Church) to David O. McKay. Covey was the grandson of Stephen Mack Covey who founded the original Little America Wyoming near Granger, Wyoming. He was athletic as a youth but suffered from a slipped capital femoral epiphysis in junior high school, requiring him to change his focus to academics and a member of the debate team and graduated from high school early.

Covey earned a bachelor's degree in business administration from the University of Utah, an MBA from the Harvard Business School (HBS), and a Doctor of Religious Education from Brigham Young University (BYU). He was a member of Pi Kappa Alpha fraternity. He was awarded ten honorary doctorates.

== Philosophical background ==
Covey was heavily influenced by Peter Drucker and Carl Rogers. Another key influence on his thinking was his study of American self-help books that he did for his doctoral dissertation. A further influence on Covey was his affiliation with the LDS Church. According to Clayton Christensen, The Seven Habits was a secular distillation of Latter-day Saint values.

== Books ==
Covey's book Spiritual Roots of Human Relations was published in 1970 by Deseret Book Company. Reading this book will identify how Covey's later works were a secular development of these earlier ideas.

=== The 7 Habits of Highly Effective People ===
The 7 Habits of Highly Effective People, Covey's best-known book, has sold more than 65 million copies worldwide since its first publication in 1989. The audio version became the first non-fiction audio-book in U.S. publishing history to sell more than one million copies. Covey argues against what he calls "The Personality Ethic", something he sees as prevalent in many modern self-help books. He promotes what he labels "The Character Ethic": aligning one's values with so-called "universal and timeless" principles. Covey adamantly refuses to conflate principles and values; he sees principles as external natural laws, while values remain internal and subjective. Covey proclaims that values govern people's behavior, but principles ultimately determine the consequences. Covey presents his teachings in a series of habits, manifesting as a progression from dependence via independence to interdependence.

=== The 8th Habit ===
Covey's 2004 book The 8th Habit: From Effectiveness to Greatness was published by Free Press, an imprint of Simon & Schuster. It is the sequel to The 7 Habits. Covey posits that effectiveness does not suffice in what he calls "The Knowledge Worker Age". He says that "the challenges and complexity we face today are of a different order of magnitude." The 8th habit essentially urges: "Find your voice and inspire others to find theirs."

=== The Leader in Me ===
Covey released The Leader in Me: How Schools and Parents Around the World Are Inspiring Greatness, One Child at a Time in November 2008. It tells how "some schools, parents and business leaders are preparing the next generation to meet the great challenges and opportunities of the 21st Century. It shows how an elementary school in Raleigh, North Carolina, decided to try incorporating The 7 Habits of Highly Effective People and other basic leadership skills into the curriculum in unique and creative ways. Inspired by the success of Principal Muriel Summers and the teachers and staff of A.B. Combs Elementary School in Raleigh, other schools and parents around the world have adopted the approach and have seen remarkable results".

== Other projects ==
=== Academia ===
Covey was a professor at the Marriott School of Management at BYU for several years, helping to establish the Master of Organizational Behavior program, which has since been merged into the MBA program. While at BYU, Covey served as an assistant to the university president.

During the late part of his life, Covey returned to academia as a professor at the Huntsman School of Business at USU, holding the Huntsman Presidential Chair.

=== Education ===
Covey developed his 2008 book The Leader in Me into several education-related projects. On April 20, 2010, he made his first post to an education blog entitled "Our Children and the Crisis in Education" which appears on the Huffington Post news and blog-aggregation website. FranklinCovey also established a Web site dedicated exclusively to The Leader in Me concept, and it holds periodic conferences and workshops to train elementary school administrators who want to integrate The Leader in Me process into their school's academic culture.

== Personal ==
=== Family ===
Covey lived with his wife, Sandra Merrill Covey, and their family in Provo, Utah, home to BYU, where Covey taught prior to the publication of his best-selling book. Parents of nine children and grandparents of fifty-five, Stephen Covey received the Fatherhood Award from the National Fatherhood Initiative in 2003.

Covey's grandson, Britain, played college football at his alma mater, University of Utah, and signed as an undrafted free agent to the Philadelphia Eagles following the 2022 NFL draft.

=== Religion ===
Covey was a practicing member of The Church of Jesus Christ of Latter-day Saints. He served a two-year mission in England for the Church. Beginning in July 1962, Covey served as the first president of the church's Irish Mission. Starting in 1973, Covey served for a time as a mission representative of the Quorum of the Twelve, where he oversaw training of missionaries in missions in the eastern United States.

When Covey studied as an MBA student at HBS, he would, on occasion, preach to crowds on Boston Common.

Covey authored several devotional works for Latter-day Saint readers, including:

- Spiritual Roots of Human Relations (1970)
- The Divine Center (1982)
- Marriage and Family: Gospel Insights (1983) co-authored with Truman G Madsen
- 6 Events: The Restoration Model for Solving Life's Problems (2004).

== Injuries and death ==
In April 2012, Covey was riding a bike in Rock Canyon Park in Provo, Utah, when he lost control and fell. He was wearing a helmet but according to his daughter, the helmet slipped and his head hit the pavement. She said Covey "went down a hill too fast and flipped forward on the bike. It was a pretty big goose egg on the top of his head." Covey also suffered cracked ribs and a partially collapsed lung.

Covey died from complications resulting from the bike accident at the Eastern Idaho Regional Medical Center in Idaho Falls, Idaho, on July 16, 2012, at the age of 79.

== Honors and awards ==
- The Thomas More College Medallion for continuing service to humanity
- The National Entrepreneur of the Year Lifetime Achievement Award for Entrepreneurial Leadership
- The 1994 International Entrepreneur of the Year Award
- One of Time Magazine's 25 most influential Americans of 1996
- The Sikh's 1998 International Man of Peace Award
- 2003 Fatherhood Award from the National Fatherhood Initiative
- 2004 Golden Gavel award from Toastmasters International
- Inducted into the Utah Valley Entrepreneurial Forum Hall of Fame on November 14, 2009
- Maharishi Award from Maharishi University of Management in Fairfield, Iowa
- Aman2020 Award from Aman Wolde foundation in Addis Ababa, Ethiopia.

== Works ==
- Spiritual Roots of Human Relations (1970) (ISBN 0-87579-705-9)
- How to Succeed with People (1971) ISBN 0875796818
- The Divine Center (1982) (ISBN 1-59038-404-0)
- Marriage and Family: Gospel Insights (1983) co-authored with Truman G Madsen
- The 7 Habits of Highly Effective People (1989, 2004) (ISBN 0-671-70863-5)
- Principle Centered Leadership (1989) (ISBN 0-671-79280-6)
- First Things First (1994), co-authored with Roger and Rebecca Merrill (ISBN 0-684-80203-1)
- The 7 Habits of Highly Effective Families : building a beautiful family culture in a turbulent world (1997) (ISBN 0-307-44008-7)
- Quest: The Spiritual Path to Success (Editor) (1997) with Thomas Moore, Mark Victor Hansen, David Whyte, Bernie Siegel, Gabrielle Roth and Marianne Williamson. Simon & Schuster AudioBook ISBN 978-0-671-57484-0
- Living the 7 Habits (2000) (ISBN 0-684-85716-2)
- 6 Events: The Restoration Model for Solving Life's Problems (2004) (ISBN 1-57345-187-8)
- The 8th Habit: From Effectiveness to Greatness (2004) (ISBN 0-684-84665-9)
- The Speed of Trust: The One Thing That Changes Everything (2006), Stephen M. R. Covey, co-authored with Rebecca Merrill; foreword by Stephen R. Covey
- The Leader in Me: How Schools and Parents Around the World Are Inspiring Greatness, One Child At a Time (2008) (ISBN 1-43910-326-7)
- The 7 Habits of Highly Effective Network Marketing Professionals (2009) (ISBN 978-1-933057-78-1)
- The 3rd Alternative: Solving Life's Most Difficult Problems (2011) (ISBN 978-1451626261)
- The Leader in Me: How Schools Around the World Are Inspiring Greatness, One Child at a Time (Second Edition) (2014) (ISBN 978-1476772189)
