= The 7 Habits of Highly Effective People =

1989 book by Stephen R. Covey

The 7 Habits of Highly Effective People.
- Author: Stephen R. Covey
- Language: English
- Subject: Self-help
- Publisher: Free Press
- Publication date: 1989
- Publication place: United States
- Media type: Print (Hardcover, Paperback)
- Pages: 381
- ISBN: 0-7432-6951-9
- OCLC: 56413718
- Dewey Decimal: 158 22
- LC Class: BF637.S8 C68 2004
- Followed by: The 8th Habit: From Effectiveness to Greatness

The 7 Habits of Highly Effective People is a business and self-help book written by Stephen R. Covey. First published in 1989, the book goes over Covey's ideas on how to spur and nurture personal change. He also explores the concept of effectiveness in achieving results, as well as the need for focus on character ethic rather than the personality ethic in selecting value systems. As named, his book is laid out through seven habits he has identified as conducive to personal growth.

== The seven habits ==
The book is structured around seven habits. Covey intends the first three as a means of achieving independence, the next three as a means of achieving interdependence, and the final habit as a means to maintain the others.

=== Be proactive ===
Proactivity is about taking responsibility for how one reacts to life experiences, taking the initiative to respond positively and improve the situation. Covey postulates, in a discussion of the work of psychiatrist Viktor Frankl, that between stimulus and response lies a person's ability to choose how to react, and that nothing can hurt a person without their consent. He goes on to introduce the concepts of the Circle of Influence and the Circle of Concern, advising individuals to focus their responses on the center of their own influence.

=== Begin with the end in mind ===
Covey discusses envisioning what one wants in the future (a personal mission statement) so one can plan and work toward it, and understanding how people make important life decisions. "To be effective, one needs to act based on principles and constantly review one's mission statements," says Covey. He asks: Are you – right now – who you want to be? What do you have to say about yourself? How do you want to be remembered? If habit 1 advises changing one's life to act and be proactive, habit 2 advises that "you are the programmer." "Grow and stay humble," Covey says.

Covey says that all things are created twice: Before one acts, one should act in one's mind first. Before creating something, measure twice. Do not just act; think first: Is this how I want it to go, and are these the correct consequences?

=== Put first things first ===
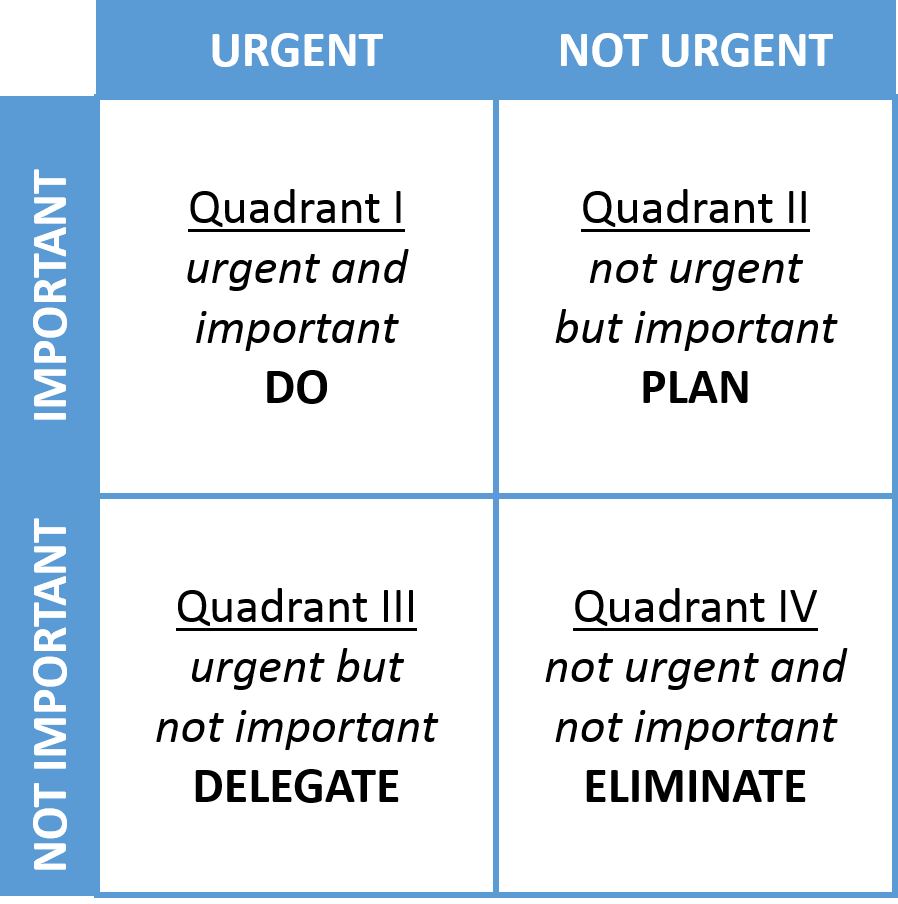
Matrix of importance versus urgency as discussed in the book

Covey distinguishes between what is important and what is urgent. Priority should be given in the following order:

- Quadrant I. Urgent and important (Do) – important deadlines and crises
- Quadrant II. Not urgent but important (Plan) – long-term development
- Quadrant III. Urgent but not important (Delegate) – distractions with deadlines
- Quadrant IV. Not urgent and not important (Eliminate) – frivolous distractions

"The order is important," says Covey: after completing items in quadrant I, people should spend the majority of their time on quadrant II, but many people spend too much time in quadrants III and IV. The calls to delegate and eliminate are reminders of their relative priority.

If habit 1 advises that "you are the programmer" and habit 2 advises to "write the program, become a leader," and habit 3 ”follow the program.” "Keep personal integrity by minimizing the difference between what you say versus what you do," says Covey.

=== Think win–win ===
"Seek mutually beneficial win–win solutions or agreements in your relationships", says Covey. Valuing and respecting people by seeking a "win" for all is ultimately a better long-term resolution than if only one person in the situation gets their way. "Thinking win–win isn't about being nice, nor is it a quick-fix technique; it is a character-based code for human interaction and collaboration", says Covey.

=== Seek first to understand, then to be understood ===
Use empathetic listening to genuinely understand a person, which compels them to reciprocate the listening and take an open mind to be influenced. This creates an atmosphere of caring and positive problem-solving.

Habit 5 is expressed in the ancient Greek philosophy of three modes of persuasion:

1. Ethos is one's personal credibility. It's the trust that one inspires, one's "emotional bank account".
2. Pathos is the empathetic side, the alignment with the emotional trust of another person's communication.
3. Logos is the logic, the reasoning part of the presentation.

"The order of the concepts indicates their relative importance", says Covey.

=== Synergize ===
"Combine the strengths of people through positive teamwork, so as to achieve goals that no one could have done alone", Covey exhorts.

=== Sharpen the saw ===
Covey says that one should balance and renew one's resources, energy, and health to create a sustainable, long-term, effective lifestyle. He primarily emphasizes exercise for physical renewal, good prayer, and good reading for mental renewal. He also mentions service to society for spiritual renewal.

Covey explains the "upward spiral" model. Through conscience, along with meaningful and consistent progress, an upward spiral will result in growth, change, and constant improvement. In essence, one is always attempting to integrate and master the principles outlined in The 7 Habits at progressively higher levels at each iteration. Subsequent development on any habit will render a different experience and one will learn the principles with a deeper understanding. The upward spiral model consists of three parts: learn, commit, do. According to Covey, one must continue consistently educating the conscience with increasing levels in order to grow and develop on the upward spiral. "The idea of renewal by education will propel one along the path of personal freedom, security, wisdom, and power", says Covey.

== Reception ==
At the end of 1994, U.S. President Bill Clinton invited Covey, along with other authors, to Camp David to counsel him on how to integrate the book's ideas into his presidency.

In August 2011, Time listed 7 Habits as one of "The 25 Most Influential Business Management Books".

Upon Covey's death in 2012, the book had sold more than 20 million copies.

== Formats and adaptations ==
In addition to the book and audiobook versions, a VHS version also exists.

In 1998, Stephen's son, Sean Covey, wrote a version of the book for teens, The 7 Habits of Highly Effective Teens, which simplifies the 7 habits for younger readers to make them easier to understand. This was later followed by The 6 Most Important Decisions You Will Ever Make: A Guide for Teens (2006), which highlights key times in the life of a teen and gives advice on how to deal with them, and The 7 Habits of Happy Kids (2008), a children's book illustrated by Stacy Curtis that further simplifies the 7 habits for children and teaches them through stories with anthropomorphic animal characters.
