= Chronicle Features =

- Formerly: Chronicle Features Syndicate
- Type: Subsidiary
- Industry: Print syndication
- Founded: 1962
- Defunct: c. 1998; 28 years ago
- Fate: acquired by Universal Press Syndicate
- Headquarters: 870 Market Street, San Francisco, California, U.S.
- Key people: Stanleigh Arnold; Stuart Dobbs
- Products: Comic strips, newspaper columns
- Owners: San Francisco Chronicle

Chronicle Features was the syndication arm of the San Francisco Chronicle. Syndicating comic strips, newspaper columns, and editorial features, it operated from 1962 to c. 1998. The syndicate was known for the offbeat comic strips it championed, such as Gary Larson's The Far Side, Dan Piraro's Bizarro, and the editorial cartoons of Ted Rall. The service was acquired by Universal Press Syndicate in 1997 and went defunct soon after.

Long-time Chronicle employee Stanleigh Arnold was the syndicate's first general manager, holding that job until his 1982 retirement. He brought on Phil Frank's Farley and Larson's Far Side. Stuart Dodds, an original employee of the syndicate, rose to sales manager and then editor/general manager, expanding the company's focus from columns to features and comic strips.

== History ==
The Chronicle Features Syndicate was formed in 1962 to syndicate the San Francisco Chronicle's star columnists. Chronicle Features' first comic strips were Dan O'Neill's Odd Bodkins and Bill Weber's Doctor Funshine, both launched in 1963. Doctor Funshine lasted four years, but O'Neill's more successful Odd Bodkins had a tumultuous end in 1970 that coincided with O'Neill's activities with the underground comix group the Air Pirates.

Phil Frank's Farley began in 1975 as Travels With Farley (a play on John Steinbeck's Travels with Charley). Farley began as a nationally syndicated strip with Chronicle Features, but Frank missed the "timeliness and joy of doing local politics" and, dissatisfied with the four-to-six week lead time required of syndication, in 1985 switched to working exclusively for the Chronicle, which enabled him to quickly mine local events — usually overnight — for his satire.

In 1985, Gary Larson left Chronicle Features for the much larger rival Universal Press Syndicate (UPS). The Far Side was replaced with Dan Piraro's Bizarro, but in 1995 Piraro also left Chronicle Features for UPS.

In 1995, Ted Rall's syndicated cartoons won the Robert F. Kennedy Journalism Award. A year later, however, Rall also left for UPS, prompting general manager Dodd to say, "There's sort of a path between us and Universal, and I'd like the grass to grow for a while." That same year, Chronicle Features turned down the chance to syndicate Aaron McGruder's The Boondocks, which went on to great success with UPS.

In 1996 Chronicle Features outsourced their sales to UPS rival United Media; Dodd claimed, "We now offer the editorial intimacy of a small syndicate and the marketing power of a large one." Nonetheless, a year later Chronicle Features was acquired by the Universal Press Syndicate, and absorbed by UPS circa 1998. (In 2011, UPS's parent company Universal Uclick took over the syndication of United Media's 150 comic strips and features).

== Chronicle Features strips and panels ==
- Art's Gallery by Art Finley (1963–1977; moved to Universal Press Syndicate where it lasted until 1981)
- Bizarro by Dan Piraro (1985–1995; moved to Universal Press Syndicate)
- Dennis Dull by Phil Young (1993) — daily panel
- Doctor Funshine by Bill Weber (February 10, 1963 – March 27, 1966) — debuted in the S.F. Chronicle on December 10, 1961
- Fair Game by Stephanie Piro (1996–1998)
- Farley by Phil Frank (1975–1985; returned solely to the S.F. Chronicle)
- The Far Side by Gary Larson (January 1, 1980 – 1985; moved to Universal Press Syndicate)
- Free Zone by Winthrop Prince (1985–1990)
- Odd Bodkins, by Dan O'Neill (1963–1970)
- Prince by Winthrop Prince (1986) — weekly panel
- Quality Time by Gail Machlis (1991–1997; moved to Universal Press Syndicate, where it lasted until August 1, 1998)

== Editorial cartoonists ==
- Faces in the News by Kerry Waghorn (1977–1997; moved to Universal Press Syndicate)
- Ted Rall (1991–1996; moved to Universal Press Syndicate)
- Mickey Siporin (1996–c. 1997)

== Columnists ==
- Herb Caen
- Count Marco (Marc H. Spinelli)
- Stanton Delaplane
- Earthweek by Steve Newman (1988–1998; moved to Universal Press Syndicate)
- Art Hoppe
- Charles McCabe
- This Wild West by Lucius Beebe (1962–1966)
- Cynthia Tucker (1991–1997; moved to Universal Press Syndicate)
- Merla Zellerbach

== See also ==
- Chronicle Publishing Company
