= Kerry Waghorn =

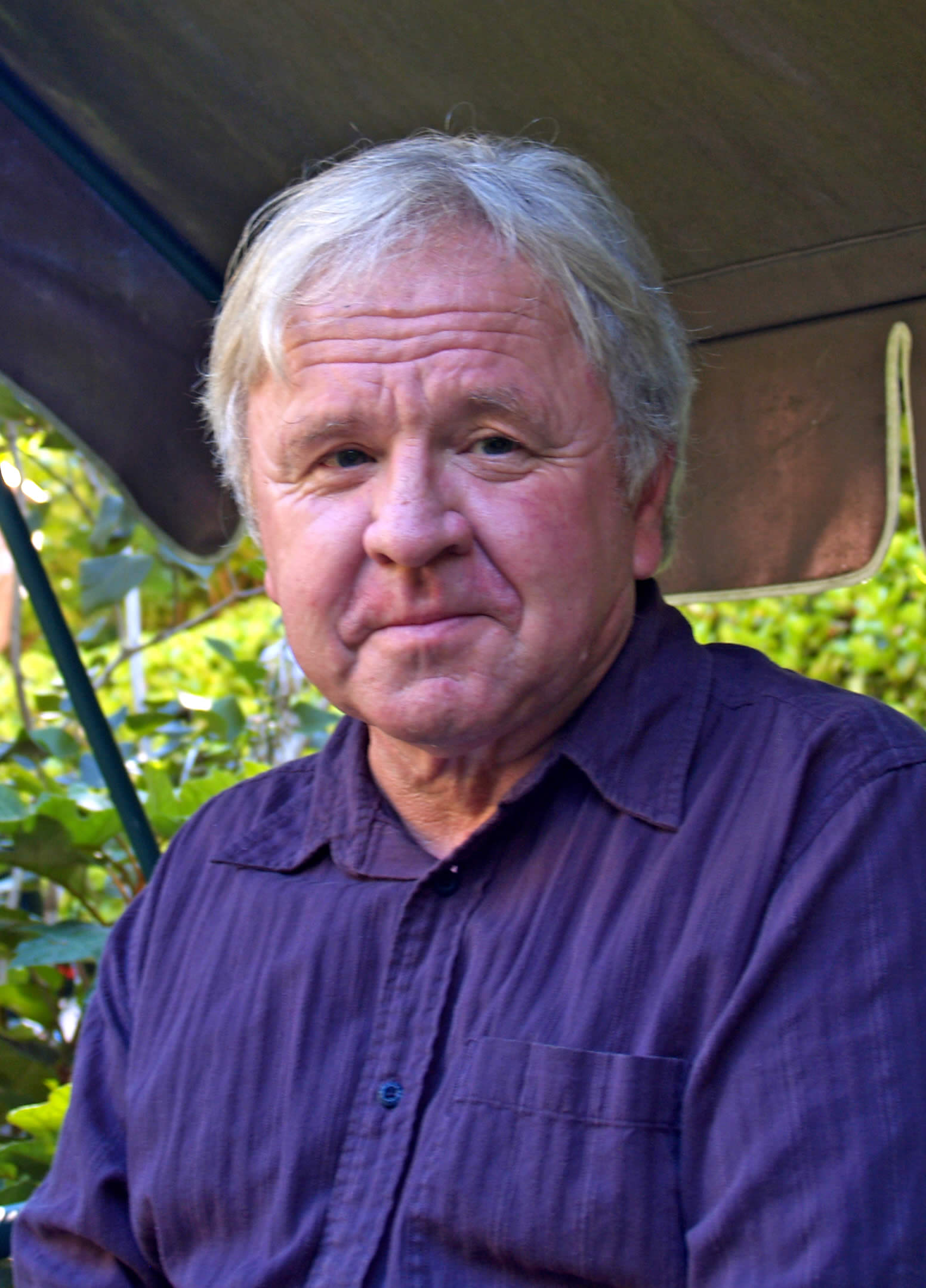
- Kerry Waghorn
- Born: Kerry Reginald Waghorn; January 10, 1947 (age 79); North Vancouver, British Columbia, Canada
- Education: Simon Fraser University
- Occupations: Artist, caricaturist, illustrator, editorial cartoonist
- Years active: 1970–present
- Spouse: Amber (Campbell) (m. 2009)
- Awards: Distinguished Citizen Award - North Vancouver, B.C. (1991)
- Website: kerrywaghorn.com

Kerry Waghorn (born January 10, 1947) is a syndicated caricaturist whose Faces in the News feature was established in 1977 by Chronicle Features (San Francisco Chronicle). He is best known for his drawings of political, business and entertainment figures from the 1970s to the 1990s.

== Early life ==
Waghorn was born and raised in North Vancouver, British Columbia. He was named for the comic strip Kerry Drake. He is the son of Raymond and Morah Waghorn. His father, also born in British Columbia, was a coppersmith in the shipbuilding industry of North Vancouver. His mother, born in Louisbourg, N.S. on Canada's east coast, moved at a young age with her family to British Columbia. Waghorn has one younger brother, Dean.

His first published cartoon was featured in Vancouver Magazine when he was 13 years old.

Waghorn graduated from North Vancouver High School in 1965 and soon after attended the recently opened Simon Fraser University in nearby Burnaby, intending to study political science. He became involved with the student newspaper The Peak as an editorial artist and layout editor. When SFU became a Canadian focal point of student and teacher protests, including the occupation of the administration buildings, Waghorn lost interest in academic pursuits in favor of a news career.

As a student, Waghorn played the drums in a succession of rock bands and also worked on fishing boats along the B.C. coast. He continued to make art and sketch fishing boats, captains and crew, as well as rock musicians.

It was the latter work that attracted the attention of the rock promoters of the late 1960s. Waghorn's first commission was a poster advertising a concert by vocalist Laura Nyro. He was invited into a partnership with poster artist Bob Masse and moved into Masse's studio in Vancouver's Gastown. He later created posters for concerts of Led Zeppelin, Elton John, the Beach Boys, Boz Scaggs, Chicago, Grand Funk, Canned Heat, Doobie Brothers, Taj Mahal and others.

During this era, The Georgia Straight began publishing his cartoons. The Straight syndicated his work to a number of alternative newspapers, including the Los Angeles Free Press, the Detroit Free Press and The Berkeley Barb.

== Career ==
Waghorn eventually began working for the city's largest daily, The Vancouver Sun, as a regular contributor under the newspaper's editorial cartoonist, Roy Peterson. Waghorn's work for The Sun exposed his cartoons to the mainstream. He continued to learn from Peterson and Len Norris.

While visiting San Francisco in 1971 with his partner in the production of rock music posters, Waghorn walked into The San Francisco Chronicle unannounced, hoping to show his art portfolio to cartoonist Robert Graysmith. Graysmith's receptionist instead introduced Waghorn to Sunday and Features Editor Stan Arnold. During the many years he spent under Arnold, he worked with a team that included Garry Trudeau (Doonesbury), Gary Larson (The Far Side), Abigail Van Buren (Dear Abby), William Hamilton (The New Yorker), Phil Frank (Farley), and Cathy Guisewite (Cathy).

Waghorn began traveling back and forth between Vancouver and San Francisco, contributing to daily newspapers and other clients.

During this period, Waghorn also created caricature art. Chronicle Features launched Faces in the News in 1977. In 1992, he illustrated a cover for the Washington Post featuring attendees of the Democratic National Convention, and he also drew the cover for the Post's 1993 inauguration issue for Bill Clinton. He drew tens of thousands of caricatures over the course of his career and in 1997 donated 5,000 drawings to the National Archives.

Waghorn credits David Levine of The New York Review of Books as a personal inspiration.

Waghorn's drawings appear in over 250 newspapers globally and have been published in more than 700 major newspapers and magazines in about 60 nations. Among the papers that have published his work are the Miami Herald, Boston Globe, Chicago Tribune, The New York Times, New York Daily News, Atlanta Journal, Montreal Gazette, Japan Times, Sydney Morning Herald, Hamilton Bermuda Business, Korea Times and New Zealand Herald.

Celebrities who have acquired their original caricature by Waghorn include Tom Selleck, Chevy Chase, Michael Ovitz, Bryan Adams, Billy Joel, Bruce Willis (who once threatened to sue Waghorn for character assassination), David Bowie, Michael Eisner, Malcolm Forbes, Greg Norman, Chris Evert, Michael Jackson and numerous U.S. and world political leaders.

In 2005, Waghorn illustrated a book, a comprehensive expose of Canada's health management titled Squandering Billions by journalist/author Gary Bannerman and co-author Dr. Don Nixdorf, a Canadian health professional.

== Personal life ==
Waghorn lives in West Vancouver with his wife, Amber. His hobbies include drawing, painting and gardening.

== Awards ==
- Distinguished Citizen Award - North Vancouver, B.C. (1991)

== Books ==
- Writing in the Rain (Harbour Publishing, 1990) ISBN 1-55017-010-4 (by Harold White, cover and illustrations by Kerry Waghorn).
- Squandering Billions (Hancock House, 2005) ISBN 0-88839-604-X (with Gary Bannerman and Dr. Don Nixdorf) - a brutally frank indictment of health spending. www.squanderingbillions.net

== Articles ==
- Desbarats, Peter and Moser, Terry; The Hecklers; McLelland and Stewart, National Film Board of Canada; Toronto, 1979
- The North Shore News, North Vancouver, B.C.; Evelyn Jacobs; August 19, 1992; "Waghorn accepts fame with modesty."
- Vancouver Magazine, Vancouver B.C.; March 1993; "Drawing the Lines"
- West Vancouver Lifestyle, West Vancouver, B.C.; Greg Potter; March, 1995; "The Pen and the Ink."
- The Vancouver Sun, Vancouver, B.C.; Oct. 4, 1997; John Mackie; "Brushed by Fame"
- Office@Home, Vancouver, B.C.; Winter 2002; Dave Strapps; "Kerry Waghorn Illustrated"
