= Irving Phillips =

American dramatist (1904–2000)

- Irving Phillips as shown in The Cartoonist Cookbook (1966).
- Born: November 29, 1904 Wilton, Wisconsin
- Died: October 28, 2000 (aged 95) Santee, California
- Areas: Cartoonist, playwright, television scriptwriter, film screenwriter, author, illustrator and educator
- Notable works: The Strange World of Mr. Mum (daily comic panel, 1958–1974); Song of the Open Road (1944 film)
- Awards: International First Prize and Cup of the Salone dell'Umorismo of Bordighera, Italy (1969)

Irving Phillips' The Strange World of Mr. Mum (January 31, 1961)

Irving Walter Phillips (November 29, 1904 – October 28, 2000) was an American cartoonist, playwright, television scriptwriter, author, illustrator and educator. He is best remembered for his daily newspaper comic panel The Strange World of Mr. Mum.

Born in Wilton, Wisconsin, Phillips began his career in show business as a violinist at the age of 17. He also played the saxophone and led his own orchestras. Phillips studied at the Chicago Academy of Fine Arts and freelanced cartoons to 36 different magazines during the Great Depression. He eventually became head of the humor staff for Esquire in the late 1930s.

Phillips scripted for motion pictures, including Song of the Open Road (1944), which featured the film debut of Jane Powell. Phillips also penned the Powell vehicle Delightfully Dangerous in 1945.

For television, Phillips wrote or co-wrote more than 250 scripts, including a first-season episode of The Ruggles (1949), one of the earliest family sitcoms on American television. He scripted plays for Matinee Theater, the afternoon anthology series telecast daily on NBC. Phillips provided scripts and animation art for the American Broadcasting Company children's program Curiosity Shop (1971).

== Cartoonist ==
As a cartoonist, he created the comics series Scuffy, which ran from 1945 to 1951. From 1958 to 1974, Phillips produced his best-known work, The Strange World of Mr. Mum, a pantomime panel which ran in 180 newspapers in 22 countries. It was initially distributed by the Hall Syndicate and later by the Field Newspaper Syndicate. There was no Sunday edition until 1961. Mr. Mum was a portly, bald and bespectacled character, who—as his name suggests—silently observed various odd, surprising or even surreal scenes. He was sometimes accompanied by his similarly silent dog. Mum was described as a "bystander on life's outer limits," and the feature's anything-can-happen humor is cited as paving the way for such later strips as Herman, The Far Side, Rhymes With Orange and Bizarro. With never a word of dialog, the humor of the strip translated well internationally; this was an interesting stylistic choice given Phillips' résumé as a professional screenwriter.

After The Strange World of Mr. Mum ended, Phillips created a few dozen large, full-color paintings based on ideas from the strip. In 1979, he worked briefly on another strip, Barnaby Bungle.

== Playwright ==
Scripting and cartooning experiences intersected in Phillips's 1955 play called The Funnyman. The play features a cartoonist who decides to discontinue a feature called Mr. Rumple, but the Rumple character objects to being canceled. Rumple must persuade his creator to continue his existence. He wrote the book for the Broadway musical, Rumple, concerning a newspaper cartoon character whose creator loses the power to portray him.

== Author ==
Phillips assembled several book collections of his comic panel. Herblock did the introduction for The Best of Mr. Mum: from The Strange World of Mr. Mum (Putnam, 1965). That book was followed by The Strange World of Mr. Mum (1967) and the 92-page No Comment by Mr. Mum (Popular Library, 1971). He also wrote and illustrated a children's book, Twin Witches of Fingle Fu (1969).

== Awards and exhibitions ==
An Irving Phillips painting in the spirit of The Strange World of Mr. Mum.

His cartoons and other artwork were shown at the New York World's Fair in 1964–1965 and at the National Cartoonist Society. His work was exhibited in solo shows at “Comedy in Art” at Arizona State University and at the El Prado Gallery in Sedona, Arizona. In 1969, Phillips won the International First Prize and Cup of the Salone dell'Umorismo of Bordighera, Italy. In 2010, a decade after Phillips' death, his paintings and original panels were exhibited at That's Entertainment in Worcester, Massachusetts in a show called Mr. Mum's the Word: An Exhibit of Comic Art and Haikus. Worcester-area poets presented works based on many of Phillips' paintings.

He taught cartooning and humor writing at Maricopa Tech and Phoenix College in Phoenix, Arizona. Zits creators Jerry Scott and Jim Borgman studied under Phillips.

Irving Phillips died in Santee, California at age 95.
