= Curiosity Shop =

- Created by: Chuck Jones
- Directed by: Pat Shields; Alan Zaslove
- Starring: John Levin; Kerry McLane; Pamelyn Ferdin; Jerelyn Fields; Barbara Minkus
- Theme music composer: Henry Mancini
- Composers: Jimmie Haskell; Dean Elliot
- Country of origin: United States
- No. of seasons: 1
- No. of episodes: 17

Production
- Executive producer: Chuck Jones
- Running time: 60 minutes
- Production company: Sandler-Burns-Marmer Productions

Original release
- Network: ABC
- Release: September 2, 1971 – January 8, 1972

Curiosity Shop is an American preschool children's educational television program produced by ABC. The show was executive produced by Chuck Jones, sponsored by the Kellogg's cereal company and created as a commercial rival to the public television series Sesame Street. Curiosity Shop was broadcast from September 11, 1971 to September 2, 1973.

The program featured three inquisitive children (two boys and a girl) who each week visited a shop populated with various puppets and gadgets, discovering interesting things about science, nature and history. Each hour-long show covered a specific theme: clothing, music, dance, weather, the five senses, space, time, rules, flight, dolls, etc.

== Production ==
After NET (soon to become PBS) premiered Sesame Street in November 1969, the show proved to be successful and gained high ratings; its success gained attention from Michael Eisner, ABC’s Vice President. He asked animator Chuck Jones to create a series to rival its success and be the executive producer. Kellogg’s signed on to be the show’s sponsor. Unlike Sesame Street, the show is geared more towards young adolescents.

Jones and Eisner tapped puppeteer Bob Baker (cofounder of the Bob Baker Marionette Theater) to create the show’s puppets and its setting. Baker was reluctant at first, though he later agreed.

Irving Phillips provided some scripts and animation art, including an animation of his syndicated comic strip The Strange World of Mr. Mum. Animations of Mell Lazarus's comic strip Miss Peach, Johnny Hart's comic strip The Wizard of Id, Virgil Partch's cartoon Big George and Hank Ketcham's Dennis the Menace were also presented on the show. Abe Levitow animated most of these short segments. Ray Bradbury is also credited as one of the show's writers.

Henry Mancini created the bossa nova theme music for the show's title sequence (animated by Jones). Dean Elliott wrote additional music for the show.

== Cast and characters ==
John Levin and Kerry McLane played Gerard and Ralph, the two boys. Alternating in the girl's role were Pamelyn Ferdin as Pam and Jerelyn Fields as Cindy.

Barbara Minkus made a regular appearance as Gittle, a witch who magically appeared whenever someone said a phrase that included "which".

Chuck Jones contributed two new animated characters to the show:

- Professor S. I. Trivia, (voiced by Bob Holt) a bespectacled "bookworm," who lived in a dictionary and was always on hand to supply a definition to a word the children didn't know.
- Monsieur Cou Cou was a French-accented bird who lived inside the shop's cuckoo clock and whose catchphrase was, "That's right!" He always tried to catch Prof. Trivia with a nosedive before the worm invariably dodged the bird just in time, repeatedly causing him to ram into the dictionary and get his beak stuck in it.

Mel Blanc, June Foray, Bob Holt, Don Messick and Les Tremayne provided the voices of the puppets.

Puppet characters

Created by Bob Baker (co-founder of the Bob Baker Marionette Theater in Los Angeles), the show's puppets included:

- Flip, (voiced by Messick) an orange hippopotamus with a jive-talking voice and oversized sneakers. Flip was the only character on the show to be portrayed as both a hand puppet and a full-body costume.
- Baron Balthazar, (voiced by Holt) a bearded, derby-hatted little man who would spin tales, in animated form, about his adventures and inventions back in his homeland, "Downtown Bosnia." The cartoons were originally a series called Professor Balthazar that was produced in Croatia when it was part of Yugoslavia (as Bosnia also was at the time).
- The Oogle, a marsupial-like silent creature with a beak-like mouth, a hayseed-style hat, and a demeanor of clownish confusion and disillusion.
- Onomatopoeia, a multi-legged furry beast that spoke in sound effects, partially inspired by an alien in a Professor Balthazar episode.
- Woodrow the groundhog, (voiced by Messick) who often yelled "Qui-e-e-e-e-e-t!" when things got out of hand and woke him from his slumber.
- Eek A. Mouse, who often emerged from the wall to scream for quiet as well.
- Nostalgia, (voiced by Foray) a chronically forgetful but sweet-tempered elephant who was intimidated by Eek.
- Hermione Giraffe, (voiced by Foray) a haughty giraffe wearing a gem-studded tiara.
- Aarthur the Aardvark, (voiced by Foray) a yellow aardvark who, contrary to the usual stereotype, hates ants.
- Ole Factory the Bloodhound, (voiced by Blanc) a wise bloodhound with hay fever.
- Halcyon the Hyena, (voiced by Blanc) a green hyena with world-weary eyes.
- Oliver Wendell Lookout, (voiced by Holt) an owl dressed in flight gear.
- Miss Fowler, a flower in a pot.

Other characters

- Two real animals made occasional appearances; Darwin, a chimpanzee who made his home in a treehouse on the show, and Eunice, a seal who lived in a waterbed — literally a water tank shaped like a bed.
- A talking computer (voiced by Blanc) with tape-reel eyes who satisfied the children's curiosity about any subject and presented educational movies, tapes, cartoons, vocabulary series, etc., on his screen-mouth.
- Hudson, a gravelly-voiced rock who told stories of prehistory. (Named as a pun after Rock Hudson, the actor.)
- Granny TV, a rocking antique television set who presented classic film comedies by Charlie Chaplin, Buster Keaton, Will Rogers, or the like.
- Havemeyer the Helping Hand, an animate white-gloved hand.
- Mr. Jones, the enigmatic owner of the store whose only means of communication between him and the visiting children was messages left on a tape recorder. Although named after series creator Chuck Jones, Messick provided the voice of the fictional Jones. Pamelyn Ferdin often concluded an episode by saying, "Goodbye, Mr. Jones — wherever you are."

Guests

Guests on the program included:

- Vincent Price in a special Halloween episode, where the Curiosity Shop took the form of a haunted house.
- Don Herbert as his TV scientist personality Mr. Wizard.
- Two appearances by Dennis the Menace cartoonist Hank Ketcham, who presented the first animated cartoons of Dennis (voiced by a young Jackie Earle Haley), as well as comic strips in which Dennis interacted with the kids on the show.

Shirley Jones appeared on the show's pilot, "The Curiosity Shop Special," which featured all four children. It was on this pilot that the first song from Multiplication Rock, "Three Is a Magic Number," would make its debut. (The pilot aired in prime time, Thursday, September 2, 1971, pre-empting Alias Smith and Jones.)

== Episodes ==
No.	Title	Original release date
1	"Why Can't My Feet Keep Time with Ralph's Ear?"	September 2, 1971
The Curiosity Shop puppets introduce themselves with a song. Ralph plays a trumpet while Gerard dances, and Pam and Cindy mock them. Ralph and Gerard are unsure if they were playing music and dancing, so the kids enter the Curiosity Shop and find Shirley Jones instead of Mr. Jones. Mr. Jones' expert answering service points them to Professor S. I. Trivia, who defines "music" and "trumpet" before Monsieur Cou Cou tries to catch him. The kids are shown clips of birds dancing by Oliver, then Miss Jones returns to give Gerard a lesson in dancing as she sings "Walking Happy". The computer tells the kids about the history of the dance. Gerard tries to do a waltz but has trouble counting to 3, so Ole Factory has him watch "Three Is a Magic Number". Ralph joins Shirley in a musical lesson where she sings "Do-Re-Mi". Meanwhile, Pam accidentally awakens Woodrow with "I Believe in Music". Gittle the Bumbling Witch sings "I'm a Brass Band" and by the magic of the "elevator to anywhere" the UCLA Bruin Marching Band is shown playing "Sons of Westwood." Baron Balthazar stars in the animated short "Starlight Serenaders".
2	"Does a Dog Forgive You if He Shakes Hands Left-Pawed?"	September 11, 1971
Three of the kids enter the Curiosity Shop to ask Mr. Jones "if people are left-handed, can dogs be left-footed?" This leads into a discussion with the computer (who knows almost everything) on the vestigial thumb. The children find out the origin of the handshake, and Gittle makes an appearance to do some magic sleight-of-hand tricks. There is also "Tennessee Birdwalk", an animated cartoon in which birds stripped of their birdness introduce word sounds, letters, and spellings, and Baron Balthazar's animated short is "Inventor Shoes".
3	"Why Can't I Put Sunshine in a Shoebox?"	September 18, 1971
Sunshine being bigger than a bread box is not the answer. The episode also deals with storms and weathermen, and Pam sings "Hurry, It's Lovely Up Here."
4	"What's a They?"	September 25, 1971
Ralph, Cindy and Gerard visit the Curiosity Shop to find out who are the "they" who make all the rules. Inside, the youngsters are not surprised that the elusive Mr. Jones is out but are delighted to find Hank Ketcham sitting at a drawing board sketching Dennis the Menace, who comes to life in animated form. As the group discusses what rules are and who make them, Baron Balthazar plays "Gimme A Little Rule," with help from Flip the Hippo and the other animal puppets, and Gittle sings "Downtown." Ketcham pleases the children by sketching them into a "Curiosity Shop" comic book. All kinds of rules come in for examination: "Look in all directions before crossing the street," "I before E except after C," "No loitering" and "Occupancy by more than 25 persons forbidden." Ketcham wraps up the show by pointing out to the kids that the world could get along fairly well with just one rule, the Golden Rule.
5	"What Tool Do You Use To Get a Yo-Yo Out of a Mailbox?"	October 2, 1971
When Gerard loses his yo-yo inside a mailbox, Ralph and Cindy join him in a trip to the Curiosity Shop to ask Mr. Jones' advice. Mr. Jones' recorded voice tells them he is out, but Hudson the Rock informs them that he was the first tool ever used by man. The Computer volunteers the information that man's tools have been borrowed from the animal world. A cow's tail becomes a fly swatter, a woodpecker at work becomes a jackhammer, and a hovering hummingbird turns into a helicopter. Next, Hot Stuff depicts the use of fire as a tool from caveman days to the present. There is an eight minute stop-motion film created by George Pal in which tools come to life and perform an intricately choreographed ballet. Gittle zaps into the shop to sing "Always Use The Proper Tool" as she flips over the pages of a pad illustrating instruments for every kind of task.
6	"Why Is a Nest...and Other Big Q Questions"	October 9, 1971
This episode devotes itself to family life, with questions about "Why Is a Nest" and such. Gittle sings "Consider Yourself" so that you can consider yourself "part of the family."
7	"Why Are Butterflies Caterpillar-Nappers?"	October 16, 1971
Gerard's refusal to believe his pet caterpillar has turned into a butterfly leads Pam and Ralph to take him to the Curiosity Shop. A discussion of how different kinds of clothing came into being ensues. Professor Trivia, with the help of a pair of animated scissors, shows the kids the evolution of various garments beginning with a square of white cloth used as a diaper. Professor Balthazar's cartoon is "Knitting Pretty", which shows how the knitmobile came to be. To prove that Charlie the caterpillar could change his clothes, Gittle zaps Gerard into a party-going outfit as the voice of Fred Astaire is heard singing his famous Top Hat, White Tie and Tails. Granny TV shows a sequence from Steamboat Bill, Jr. in which Buster Keaton buys a new hat. In the manner of an amusement park photo gallery, Ralph and Pam try on clothes from different periods: Caesar and Cleopatra, Romeo and Juliet and George and Martha Washington. Gittle sings "What's the Latest, What's the Greatest?" while a montage of fashions flash by, making the point that while fashions can change, what stays the same is you. The Animal Wall puppets join the kids to sing "What Would We Do Without Clothing?", and Gerard's mother breaks things up by calling him home.
8	"How Come You Can't Smell A Rose With Your Ear?"	October 23, 1971
Ralph, Cindy and Gerard are curious about the holes in their heads, which they use to hear, see, smell and taste. In their search for answers, the young trio look through a variety of lenses and eye glasses to discover differences in perception. By means of cinematic magic, the Elevator to Anywhere takes the kids on a trip through Gerard's auditory canal. Gittle sings "Give Your Nose A Sniff" as she tells Gerard how a nose can be magic. Granny TV shows the "Thanksgiving Feast" sequence from The Gold Rush while discussing the sense of taste. Everyone joins in to sing about making the most of your five senses in the song "Aren't You Glad You're You".
9	"Where Do You Go to Get Out of a Scare?"	October 30, 1971
Gerard, Ralph and Cindy look for a way to cure Gerard's hiccups and find Vincent Price ensconced in a black armchair inside a cobweb-draped Curiosity Shop. They find a drastic change in the appearance of the animal puppets; Halcyon is in wolf-man makeup, Ole Factor has become the Hound of the Baskervilles and Hermione looks like Vampira with long black hair and fangs. Whispering to the kids they are going to play a game called Scare, Vincent shows them clips from several horror films ranging from The Phantom of the Opera to The Abominable Dr. Phibes. Baron Balthazar's animated short is "Martin Makes It To The Top" and the Onomatopoeia leads them all in singing the "Onomatopoeia Scare Song". Vincent and Gittle have a run-in over a bubbling witch's cauldron and Gittle sings "These Wonderful Things". She then turns into Medusa, Lorelei and the Wicked Witch of the East and they all sing in harmony. A cartoon about "The Groon," created by Ray Bradbury, appears with a flick of Mr. Price's hand and everybody joins to sing "There's No Such Thing As Fear".
10	"What Do You Say Over A Pair of Dead Sneakers?"	November 6, 1971
Pam, Ralph and Gerard visit the Curiosity Shop to ask Mr. Jones if you can "love" a pair of old sneakers. Miss Peach and her wacky pupils come to life in a cartoon about emotions. The Committee, an improvisational comedy group described as the First Slapstick Dramatic Quartet, demonstrates the emotions of fear, sadness, joy and love. The trio discuss how colors indicate one's emotions, such as red for anger, green for jealousy and yellow for fear. Gittle joyously sings "Applause" and Ole Factory mournfully sings "Nobody". Baron Balthazar's animated short is "Arts and Flowers." Note: Starting with the July 8, 1972 rerun, the episode's name was changed to "What Do You Say Over A Pair of Blown-Out Sneakers?"
11	"But What's Leonardo da Vinci Flown Lately?"	November 13, 1971
Ralph, Pam and Gerard visit Curiosity Shop to ask Mr. Jones about flying following an attempt by Gerard to fly with wings made by Ralph of umbrella halves and yardsticks. Cartoonist Virgil Partch brings "Big George" to life in an animated version of the legend of Icarus who was destroyed when he flew too close to the sun. Granny TV shows film on early air pioneers and Havemeyer the Helping Hand introduces the youngsters a book on flying saucers and the film "Certain Prophecies". Mr. Jones refers the kids to the Computer who informs them of Leonardo da Vinci's fame as an architect, astronomer and painter as well as a forerunner in aeronautical engineering.
12	"When Is a Home Not a House?"	November 20, 1971
Training a pigeon to "home" leads Ralph, Cindy and Gerard into a discussion with Mr. Jones about houses and homes, design and architecture. Hudson the Rock gives a commentary on the Rock family and how some of the rocks in his family were used in construction and design. Baron Balthazar's animated short is "Light Housekeeping", and the history of Archy Tech, perennial designer, is told in a line drawing cartoon. Havemeyer the Helping Hand discusses redesigning the body with the kids and Gittle appears to lead the entire shop in singing "Aren't You Glad You're You". After a discussion about homes and houses with the inhabitants of the Animal Wall, the children see the film The House That Jack Built, and Baltazar joins with Ralph, Cindy and Gerard to sing "What Would We Do Without Houses?"
13	"How Does a Horse Play Man-shoes?"	November 27, 1971
Gerard wants to know how a horse would play man-shoes. In the shop, Ralph, Cindy and John find a young visitor, Jennifer, who joins them in talking to Dennis and his creator Hank Ketcham. They watch a "Dennis the Menace" cartoon and "Starlight Serenaders" with Baron Balthazar, who reverts to his puppet self to invent some new games. Cindy sings "Windmills of Your Mind" and the kids explore the Playground of Tomorrow, which is filled with kinetic sculptures. Ketcham delights the youngsters by putting them into an adventure comic book. The visit concludes with the Animal Wall and kids singing "Anything You Can Do".
14	"How Do You Fix a Broken Funnybone?"	December 4, 1971
Gerard discovers the Oogle is unable to laugh, so he bands the rest of the Shop together to fix his funnybone. An animated cartoon about the day they stopped laughter in the Land of Id is presented by Johnny Hart, and The Committee returns to tell "Goldilocks and the Three Bears" as it's never been told before. Gittle sings "Put on a Happy Face" and Baron Balthazar appears in "The Rise and Fall of Horatio." Granny TV shows a sequence with comedian W.C. Fields in The Golf Specialist, and the Animal Wall sings "Be a Clown."
15	"Can a Ladybug Think Better than a Gentleman Bug?"	December 11, 1971
Speculation about whether or not a ladybug can think leads Gerard, Ralph and Pam to the Curiosity Shop to confer with Mr. Jones and discuss thinking vs. instinct. Irving Phillips brings The Strange World of Mr. Mum to life in an original animated short, and an animated sequence shows the many kinds of heads there are, from hammers to cabbages, and their various uses. The Oogle does a comedy sequence in which he pits his wits against a ladder, and Eek A. Mouse sings "Think Big." Baron Balthazar discusses modern inventions and demonstrates some of his own including his "Instant Master-painting Spray" and Gittle sings "Discovering Me." Granny TV wakes up long enough to tell the youngsters about Emil Cohl, a newspaper cartoonist who first thought of applying the principle of the comic strip to the screen in 1908.
16	"Do You Measure an Inchworm Up and Down or Back and Forth?"	December 18, 1971
An inch-and-a-half inchworm named Alfred takes Gerard, Pam, and Ralph to the Curiosity Shop for a discussion about measuring. The youngsters learn from the computer that the system of measuring America uses today was started back in 900 A.D. by an English ruler, King John. Professor Balthazar demonstrates how to measure time in the animated short "Of Mice And Ben", then, reverting to his puppet self, he shows his "Pigmy Pupils" what world records you could set in just 60 seconds while he plays Chopin's "Minute Waltz" as they watch film clips on Granny TV. Johnny Hart animated his favorite "B.C." segment in "The Invention of the Sundial". Pam and Nostalgia discuss life expectancy as Pam vocalizes her predicament with "In Between". The short film Cosmic Zoom gives the trio a lesson in perspective. Gittle zaps into the shop to sing "Inchworm" as Gerard's mother summons him to come home "pronto". He leaves the shop wondering if pronto is longer than shortly.
17	"How Come I Can't Remember What I Was Told Not to Forget?"	January 8, 1972
Gerard can't remember what the string tied around his finger is supposed to make him not forget so he, along with Pam and Ralph, goes to discuss the problem with Mr. Jones. There, Nostalgia offers to help, pointing out that elephants never forget, and Flip the Hippo recalls a former girlfriend as he sings and dances "Huggin' and Kissin'". This leads into flashbacks of former visits to the Curiosity Shop and the various things the kids have learned. Granny TV says that one thing that should not be forgotten is Charlie Chaplin and shows the kids his memorable "Bun Dance" from The Gold Rush. Gittle's song is repeated from "Where Do You Go To Get Out Of A Scare". Baron Balthazar's animated short is "Happiness For Two" and the further adventures of Miss Peach emphasize what it means to be insensitive.
