= Art's Gallery =

Comic strip (1962-1981)

- Author(s): Art Finley
- Current status/schedule: Concluded daily gag panel
- Launch date: January 15, 1962
- End date: June 22, 1981
- Syndicate(s): Chronicle Features (1963–1977); Universal Press Syndicate (1977–1981)
- Genre(s): Humor, History

Art's Gallery is a daily comic strip by Art Finley which lasted from 1962 to 1981. It was featured in the San Francisco Chronicle during its run and was syndicated by Chronicle Features from 1962 to 1977, when it moved to Universal Press Syndicate until 1981. The strip consisted of 19th-century woodcut panels from the Chronicle's archives, to which Finley added humorous and contemporary captions.
