= Gary Bannerman =

Canadian journalist and writer (1947–2011)

Gary William Bannerman
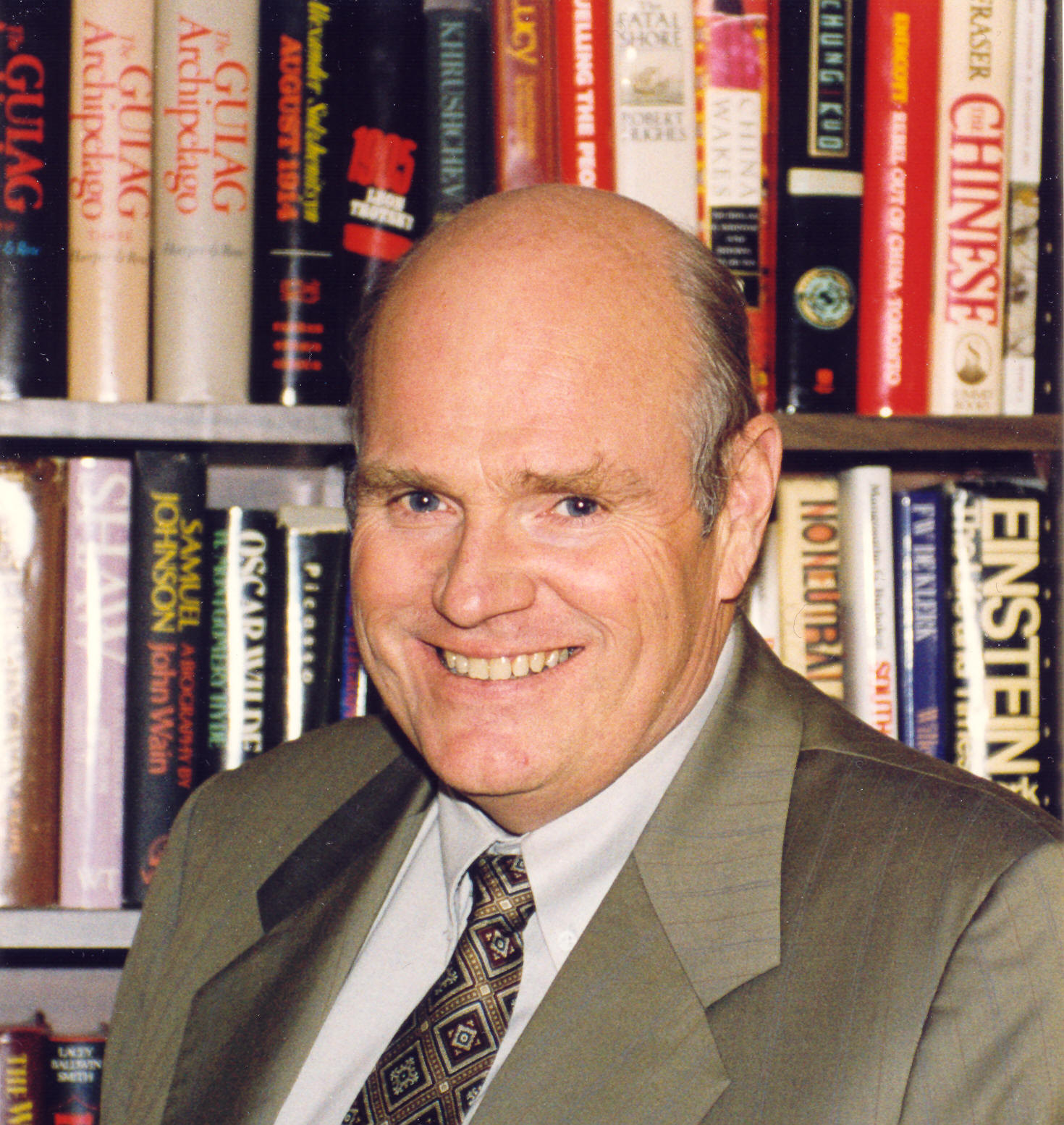
- Gary William Bannerman
- Born: Gary William Bannerman; May 23, 1947; Sydney, Nova Scotia, Canada
- Died: July 11, 2011 (aged 64); Vancouver, British Columbia, Canada
- Occupations: Broadcaster, writer and corporate communications consultant
- Notable credit(s): TV Week Viewers Choice Award (1988), Canada 125 Confederation Commemorative Medal (1992), Official Commendation: Canadian Penitentiary Service (1975)
- Spouse(s): Patricia Mary (Walrond), 1971
- Website: www.bannerline.net

Gary William Bannerman (May 23, 1947 – July 11, 2011) was a broadcaster, writer and corporate communications consultant based in Vancouver, British Columbia, Canada, and the author of several books. From 1973 until 1988 on Western Canada's largest radio station, CKNW, he hosted the dominant public affairs radio program in British Columbia, a three-hour network forum each weekday consisting of news, investigative reporting, celebrity interviews and open-line audience participation. His books focused on history, passenger shipping and, most recently, wasteful spending in the health care industry. In 1989, he and his wife Patricia, through their holding company Bannerline Enterprises Ltd., established Bannerline Corporate Communications, a consulting firm, advising what would become a long list of corporations both small and large. Although he continued to broadcast part-time for CKNW and other radio stations through most of the 1990s, the consulting and writing endeavours had become so time-consuming that media work was restricted to rare guest appearances. Bannerman died July 11, 2011, from liver complications.

== Biography and personal life ==
Bannerman was born in Sydney, Nova Scotia, the eldest child of William MacDonald Bannerman and Norma Agnes (Scobie) Bannerman. His father's ancestry dated back to the first Scots settlers of Nova Scotia, immigrants from northernmost Sutherland who landed in Pictou County in 1773 aboard The Hector. His maternal Scobie grandparents emigrated to Canada from Paisley, Scotland, settling in Sydney in 1923. His father "Bill" was a salesman who spent most of his career with Goodyear Tire and Rubber Company, for many years the company's regional manager for Atlantic Canada, based in Moncton, NB. Bannerman was followed in the family by brother Ross and sisters Wendy and Karen. As his father's career evolved, promotions moved the family from Sydney to Moncton; then to Halifax, NS, and finally back to Moncton to stay.

== Education and early career ==
Bannerman graduated with honours from Moncton High School in 1965. He was accepted into the Canadian Army's Regular Officer Training Plan (ROTP) and attended Le College Militaire Royale du Saint-Jean, near Montreal (now defunct), the only bilingual college of Canada's three military universities, transferring the next year with ROTP to the University of New Brunswick. A serious car accident in the state of Maine early in 1967 led to weeks of hospitalization, making it impossible-to-complete his university year.

During the summer of 1966, between the two universities, he had obtained a job in Wabush, Newfoundland and Labrador through family connections, and ended up as an engineer's assistant monitoring asphalt paving contracts. After full recovery from the car accident injuries a year later, this qualified him for a similar position with the New Brunswick Department of Highways, assigned to inspect and monitor the work of contractors on a major project in southwestern New Brunswick. It was during this period that he contemplated the future. He became certain that engineering would not be his career although university was still in the plans.

One morning, at a cafe in St. George, New Brunswick, he was reading the Saint John Telegraph-Journal and spotted an advertisement that the newspaper was seeking to hire a junior reporter, with or without experience. Bannerman had always been a prolific writer: letters, essays, school newspapers, club newsletters and wherever a need presented itself; and he had always had a keen interest in government, politics and news of any description. Spontaneously, he wrote an application for the job and, after a subsequent interview, he began work at the paper. Newspapering became a passion so great that the prospect of doing anything else would soon seem absurd.

== Patricia and marriage ==
Bannerman's newspaper work moved him to Vancouver in September 1970. Also that month, arriving from England to reside just a few blocks away from Bannerman's apartment was Patricia Walrond, an artist, photographer, professional secretary and world traveller. Her previous adventures had led to lengthy stays and employment in Germany, Sicily, Greece, Israel and Australia. This time she had traveled to join friends who had painted an exciting portrait of the west coast of Canada. She gained employment in Vancouver as secretary of a respected arts organization Jeunesses Musicales, which organized concert tours of performers across Canada and Patricia would subsequently become secretary to the Director of the Vancouver Art Gallery. Bannerman and Patricia met early in 1971. They were married in September of that year and considered Patricia's family base in London (Wimbledon) as important in their lives as Canada. The daughter of William Eric Walrond, a Lloyd's of London underwriter and broker, and Rosemary (Larcom), Patricia would soon add a creative dimension to a succession of Bannerman's writing and business pursuits. They continued to build the business together and travel the world whenever opportunities presented themselves. They did not have any children.

== The newspaper years ==
Under the mentorship of Telegraph-Journal managing editor Fred Hazel, Bannerman's development as a reporter was meteoric. Within months he had traversed the usual apprenticeship through obituaries, menial rewrites, the cop shop, the courts, City Hall and canvassing the provincial hinterlands nightly by telephone for any useful items scavenged by contacts and stringers. A fortuitous vacancy emerged in the provincial capital, Fredericton, and Bannerman was posted there as a one-man bureau responsible for coverage of government and all happenings in the capital city. Only when the Legislature was in session or when major stories erupted would he get more senior help from the Saint John newsroom. Within a year of his posting he was not only writing for the Telegraph-Journal, he became an Atlantic Provinces stringer for Time Canada, the Globe & Mail (Toronto), the Toronto Star, the Star Weekly, Maclean's magazine, The Montreal Star and, through a Toronto agency, hundreds of trade and business publications. His output of stories was so prolific that he would, on occasion, overwhelm the CN-CP Telecommunications office in Fredericton. The solution was the installation by CN-CP of his own teletype machine in the bedroom/office of his apartment. After that, Bannerman would type his stories directly on the teletype keyboard creating tape that would later be fed through the machine over the phone lines to his editors in Saint John and across Canada.

This New Brunswick chapter was remarkable in other ways. He leveraged his support for the military into outstanding stories from the army at CFB Gagetown and flights with the air force to the Canadian Arctic, the Caribbean and the Mediterranean; usually rough no-frills passage, brief stops (if any) - the RCAF CP-107 Argus could remain aloft over the Arctic for up to 30 hours per flight - and down time almost exclusively in military messes, but great adventures for a young reporter. It was during this Fredericton period that Bannerman became schooled in political strategy, developing friendships with a notable Liberal backroom strategist Wendell Fulton and Conservative thinkers such as the national guru Dalton K. Camp and Richard B. Hatfield. Hatfield, who became a close personal friend for the rest of his life, became the longest serving Premier in New Brunswick history (1970–1987).

In addition to the Telegraph-Journal's Hazel, Bannerman worked for and learned from some of the most remarkable people in Canadian journalism: John Scott of Time Canada, Richard L. Duncan of Time International (eventually to become managing editor of Time Inc.); Clark Davey, then managing editor of the Globe & Mail; Courtenay Tower of Maclean's; and, Charles Lynch, chief of Southam News, then in charge of bureaus around the world.

By 1970, Bannerman was receiving offers to work at major urban dailies outside of the Maritime provinces, but the decision to leave was difficult. In major markets with scores of talented and established reporters available, the freelance sideline would be nowhere near so lucrative, nor would his work be exclusively the best of the prime assignments. Eventually, however, it became apparent that career development required that big step. He first approached Lynch and the Southam News boss - by then a national icon - told Bannerman to take his pick of any Southam newspaper coast to coast and he would endeavour to get him placed. When he advised Lynch that the Vancouver Province would be preferred (an opportunity to learn about the west coast) Bannerman insisted upon just one prerequisite from any new employer: the role must be full-time political reporting, a beat position.

The Province recruited him to cover Vancouver City Hall and also the provincial legislature, as the junior of two reporters when the Legislature was in session in the BC capital of Victoria. Both assignments were fortuitous. In 1970, reclaiming the cities was "in" and Bannerman soon evolved the City Hall beat into a column on Urban Affairs, also writing about developments nationally and internationally. The newspaper gave him a budget to travel and he visited the mayors of Toronto, Montreal (the charismatic Jean Drapeau) and the urban affairs minister in Ottawa. In Victoria, he would soon become close to perhaps the greatest figure in British Columbia history, Premier W.A.C. Bennett. When Bannerman privately introduced himself to the legendary Bennett, a NB native himself, and advised that his brother Russell Bennett had been one of his teachers in Moncton High School, Bennett somewhat adopted the new arrival. Another mentorship began and intensified after Bennett was defeated in the 1972 election. Bannerman would later work with W.A.C. Bennett and write his last formal paper on any topic, a brief to a Royal Commission studying BC Rail, which was published in full in The Vancouver Sun, spanning two full pages.

Another aspect of the work at The Province, nurtured and supported by his editors, was investigative reporting, which had become somewhat of a specialty. Several exposés of frauds and misbehaviour had attracted widespread attention. This is the work that piqued the interest of CKNW Radio and led to another intriguing job offer.

== Broadcasting ==
Radio icon Jack Webster left CKNW Radio in 1972, departing amid an acrimonious contract dispute and signing with a rival radio station. A talk radio host and reporter, who spoke with a distinctive Glaswegian Scots brogue, he was a media figure on the west coast and a national Canadian celebrity.

His departure was a crisis for the CKNW broadcasting battleship, creating a serious challenge to the station's preeminence. Program director Hal Davis, who had likely developed more genuine stars than anyone in the national industry, faced a real challenge. A decision was made to replace Webster - temporarily - with a team of people to be known as "The Investigators". The hope of some at the station was that if a team could succeed, no one personality would be able to hold the station to ransom but Davis, privately, knew that the odds would be better if, within the team, they also developed a personality for the future. The bigger problem was the title "Investigators", with promotions implying a daily menu of non-stop exposés. Davis knew that major investigations can each take months and also a more disturbing fact: the skill set of a radio news reporter requires quick thinking, speed, the ability to grasp the essence of a story from complicated information and to then move on. Investigations require plodding deliberation, study, frustration, the patient development of sources, legal counselling and frequent dead end streets. Davis had hired Jack Webster from The Vancouver Sun many years before, and attributed much of Jack's success to his newspaper training.

He looked in that direction again and discovered Bannerman at The Province, who had quickly become prominent in Vancouver and who had established a track record for investigative reporting. Bannerman had always been intrigued by news talk radio and welcomed the challenge. He began in 1972 as a reporter for "The Investigators" and by 1973 he was the principal host. The program became "Gary Bannerman and the Investigators" and, eventually, just the "Gary Bannerman Show".

For 16 years, the program offered a steady parade of Prime Ministers, Premiers and newsmakers of all descriptions, including Arab Princes, show business celebrities, best selling authors and business leaders. Prominent guests and associates included two former heads of the U.S. Central Intelligence Agency (William Colby and Adm. Stansfield Turner), Bob Hope, Henry Mancini, Nana Mouskouri, Cleo Laine, Yehudi Menuhin, Muhammad Ali, Melvin Belli, Moshe Dayan, Prince Sultan bin Salman of Saudi Arabia, Victor Borge, Dizzy Gillespie and Norman Vincent Peale. An inveterate traveller, Bannerman has done interviews and documentaries from around the world, including coverage of the 1973 Middle East war.

His work as a reporter exposed numerous fraudulent business practices, assisting police in obtaining criminal convictions. The aggressive programming generated 150 libel suits, most of which did not progress beyond threats and an exchange of letters, but several became high-profile media and/or courtroom events. An exposé of activities of the Church of Scientology led to a lawsuit and evidentiary challenges that twice went all the way up to the Supreme Court of Canada. Another celebrated jury trial faced off against a lawyer who made a practice of defending Canadian Nazi sympathizers. Bannerman and CKNW never lost a case, owing principally to courageous station management who budgeted for these events, stood behind the program and who retained outstanding barristers: Charles R. Maclean, QC; Douglas A. Hogarth, QC and Thomas R. Braidwood, QC. Maclean and Hogarth are deceased. Hogarth and Braidwood became distinguished Supreme Court Judges, Braidwood to BC's highest court, the Court of Appeal.

Despite the undefeated score in libel, there were mistakes and misadventures addressed by the justice system. Two of the libel actions required nominal out-of-court settlements ($5,000 each) and twice he was fined: in one instance Bannerman was held in contempt for violating a ban of publication of evidence in a major underworld drug case; and, in another he was fined under the Broadcast Act for conducting an on-air political poll on an election day. However, he is ashamed of only one incident in the long broadcast career. This was an editorial in 1985 which intended to question Prime Minister Brian Mulroney's statement, "I believe in native self-government," discussing both self-government and self-sufficiency. In the course of the argument he pointed out the serious social problems on many of the country's reserves, suggesting that native leaders have to take more responsibility for both creating and dealing with these matters. None of this would have been out of line. Bannerman had consistently been on the side of responsible native leaders throughout both his newspaper and broadcasting career. The problem with this event is that the editorial - which escalated into what could only be described as a tirade - seemed to forget that Mulroney's ingenuous politics were the issue, and repeatedly cited a long list of problems on Indian reserves. The tone was venomous. Bannerman was quick to apologize, but the Nisga'a people of the British Columbia north and the Musqueam Band (Coast Salish) filed a formal complaint with the national broadcasting regulator. The native bands were both eloquent and patient in their appeal. Others clamoured for punitive action against CKNW and Bannerman. Eventually, the Canadian Radio-Television and Telecommunication Commission issued a written reprimand for a broadcast which might have had the consequence of engendering racism. Critics persisted to complain until it reached the desk of the Justice Minister of Canada, John Crosbie, who publicly said that the Canadian Radio-television and Telecommunications Commission (CRTC) ruling was the final word, and chastized those who continued to politicize the matter.

Among Bannerman's areas of special interest both in newspaper and radio days was crime, corrections and penal reform. He conducted precedent-setting remote broadcasts from behind the walls of prisons, and, on three separate occasions in 1975, he negotiated violent hostage taking incidents. One of these was perpetrated by three of the most dangerous killers in Canadian prisons who locked 15 hostages in a large walk-in office safe. The event lasted 41 hours spanning three days, a period during which Bannerman and lawyer Bryan Williams (later Chief Justice of the British Columbia Supreme Court) regularly visited the hostage area in attempts to keep matters calm and to free the hostages. The incident ended in violence after hostages tried to break free of the dozing criminals, noise that sprung the SWAT team into action with considerable gunfire. When calm returned, one of the inmates, Andy Bruce, had suffered multiple wounds, including a bullet to the head (he survived) and one hostage, Mary Steinhauser, was dead. The story was reported in newspapers all around the world. It eventually became the subject of a formal Commission of Inquiry, a stage play and a motion picture, Walls. Among the awards Bannerman cherishes most is an Official Commendation from the Canadian Penitentiary Service (now Corrections Canada).

The Bannerman program was consistently at the centre of British Columbia activity: among the highlights were the redevelopment of Vancouver's historic neighbourhood, Gastown; a central role in winning final approval for a convention centre on the waterfront, what is now the national icon Canada Place; support for and coverage of the World's Fair Expo '86; major power developments and the extraordinary achievements of BC Ferries, BC Hydro and BC Rail.

=== Winding down ===
Following Expo '86 and a change of BC government later that year, with close friend Bill Vander Zalm emerging as premier, Bannerman said the radio life seemed to become anticlimactic, repetitive and even - on occasion - irrelevant. During the next two years he started to frequently display symptoms of what could only be described as burnout: overly temperamental, too much drinking and on-again off-again disputes with the new manager of CKNW about program content.

Despite record ratings, constant pressure was brought by the station upon Bannerman to do commercial advertising endorsements, something he uniquely refused to do throughout his entire career at great financial cost. His view was always that it is impossible to do exposés of fraud involving one business while accepting cash from a competitor to publicly endorse their product. Even more grating were instructions to make the program more like American daytime TV talk, the freak-a-minute variety allegedly of appeal to a larger, lower mentality audience. Bannerman also refused to do this, standing behind contract provisions that gave him the power over program content. He warned that the station's attempt to "dumb-down" programming would ultimately have disastrous impact on both the integrity of the product and its place in the market.

By his own admission, his behaviour became defiant and unprofessional and his health seemed to suffer. For 20 years he had never missed a day of work, but suddenly, in June 1988 he was rushed to hospital with a life-threatening liver condition. It would be two years before doctors reported a 100 percent return to good health, but coincidental with his release from hospital in late June 1988, it was time for contract negotiations. Determined not to continue in radio unless new understandings were in place about program management and content, he says he delivered a contract proposal to CKNW that had a "take it or leave it" tone, a complete departure from the collegial approach to programming that had built CKNW. Unsurprisingly, the management chose not to renew the agreement, but subsequently was courteous, generous and professional in every aspect of the separation. (After a change of management at CKNW, Bannerman would return to the station on a part-time basis through most of the 1990s).

== Books ==
- Gastown: The 107 Years (Lagoon Estates, 1972)

A byproduct of Bannerman's newspaper support for the redevelopment of Vancouver's historic precinct from a disgusting skid road to a major tourist attraction, was this 40,000-word magazine format book chronicling history and the redevelopment project, including a historic walking tour of the neighbourhood.

- Cruise Ships: The Inside Story (Saltaire, 1976)

Charles R. White of Victoria BC, a significant investor in and developer of BC broadcast media, was a personal friend of Stan McDonald of Seattle, the founder of Princess Cruises. McDonald complained to White that libraries were full of books about passenger ships and the glory days of the North Atlantic, but that there was nothing available as a guidebook to the modern development of ships as a vacation destination, the new cruise industry. White convinced Bannerman that his former newspaper prominence still had some brand value left and that he should take on this guide book project as a hobby. Bannerman and Patricia worked on it together and what emerged was the first ever guidebook to the modern cruise industry, with Patricia's photograph of McDonald's Island Princess at anchor off Puerto Vallarta on the cover.

- Cruise Ships: The Inside Story (Collins, 1982) ISBN 0-00-216837-5

White's Saltaire Publishing edition was so successful it attracted the attention of the Canadian division of the British publisher Collins and a completely new book was the result, with only about 25 percent of the original content surviving.

- Bon Voyage: The Cruise Travellers' Handbook (Passport, 1984 and 1986) - LCCN 84-60594 ISBN 0-8442-9547-7

Passport Books, an imprint of Chicago-based National Textbook Company bought the American rights to the cruise book and, with appropriate updating by the author on each occasion, had two printings of the book.

- The Ships of British Columbia (Hancock House, 1985) ISBN 0-88839-188-9

This coffee table book was the official history of the BC Ferry Corporation, by far Canada's largest passenger shipping company and one of the largest ferry systems in the world. Patricia, who contributed original photography and sorted through thousands of historical pictures to choose the 280 ultimately published, received title credit as co-author.

- Collingwood School: The First Ten Years (Hancock House, 1994) ISBN 0-88839-243-5

This was a coffee table book to honour the 10th anniversary of a prestigious West Vancouver private school, authored by Bannerman and featuring outstanding photography by Lloyd Sutton and Patricia Bannerman, and major art contributions from the eminent British illustrator John Batchelor.

- Squandering Billions (Hancock House, 2005) ISBN 0-88839-604-X

This book is a brutally frank indictment of health spending, demonstrating that the absolute power of medical doctors, pharmaceutical companies, health bureaucrats and hospital administrators, enshrines mediocrity at the expense of patients. It was coauthored Dr. Don Nixdorf, executive director of the BC Chiropractic Association, with substantial input from one of the architects of Canada's Medicare, Dr. Pran Manga, an economist at the University of Ottawa. This book is illustrated by internationally syndicated caricaturist Kerry Waghorn.

== Bannerline Enterprises Ltd. - the business ==
Bannerline was incorporated in 1974 by Gary and Patricia Bannerman as an umbrella company for all activities: radio contracts, freelance writing, investments, books, art and photography. The name for the company was suggested by CKNW's programming genius, the late Hal Davis, who used that title for a daily editorial Bannerman delivered during his first years at the station. Davis' idea was to connect the newspaper background with the surname. Over the years, the company has owned and managed real estate investments, a major share of a two-office travel agency, shares in the Canadian subsidiary of a British television production company and a vast range of smaller ventures. Bannerman has served on several Boards of Directors over the years, both publicly traded and private companies. Principal among these was the Board of the BC Ferry Corporation from 1989 until 1992.

After leaving CKNW, Bannerman and British Columbia Premier Bill Vander Zalm seriously discussed a full-time Principal Secretary position in the Premier's Office. Instead, he began accepting consulting assignments in 1989 from associates who operated large corporate enterprises. The business was fundamentally engaged with communications strategy and long term planning. Associates provided expert services for graphic design, publishing, the Internet, video production, advertising, media relations, market research, art and photography. Two internationally renowned artists were part of the team: John Batchelor of Wimborne, Dorset, England, likely the most renowned technical illustrator in the world; and, Kerry Waghorn of North Vancouver, British Columbia, whose Faces in the News caricatures have been in world syndication since 1977. Now represented by Universal Press Syndicate, Kerry's work has appeared in more than 400 publications in about 60 countries.

== Awards ==
Among the honours received by Gary Bannerman were:

- Junior Chamber of Commerce (1974). Nominated: Outstanding Young Canadian
- B'nai B'rith of Canada (1975), national award for humanitarian broadcasting
- Official Commendation: Canadian Penitentiary Service (1975)
- Freeman of Gastown (1978)
- Royal Canadian Legion (1981), National Media Award
- Vancouver Rotary (1982), annual award for service above self
- British Columbia Association of Broadcasters (1983), Annual Community Service Award
- Honorary Member: Vancouver Police Pipe Band (since 1984)
- Honorary Member: Penticton Detachment, Royal Canadian Mounted Police (since 1987)
- TV Week Viewers Choice Award (1988). Best radio talk show host
- Shalom Branch (Vancouver), Royal Canadian Legion, Citizen of the Year 1989
- Canada 125 Confederation Commemorative Medal (1992)
- International Downtown Association - re: Downtown Vancouver, top international award for downtown management (2000) †

† An award won by the Downtown Vancouver Business Improvement Association, based on a "Culture of Communications" plan designed by BANNERLINE.
