= The Strange World of Mr. Mum =

American comic strip by Irving Phillips

- Irving Phillips' The Strange World of Mr. Mum (January 22, 1961)
- Author: Irving Phillips
- Current status/schedule: Daily and Sunday; concluded
- Launch date: May 5, 1958
- End date: 1974
- Syndicate(s): Hall Syndicate; Field Newspaper Syndicate
- Genre(s): humor, adults

The Strange World of Mr. Mum was a surreal humor comic panel by Irving Phillips which was published from May 5, 1958, to 1974. At its peak, it appeared daily in 180 newspapers across 22 countries. Initially distributed by the Hall Syndicate, it was later handled by the Field Newspaper Syndicate. A Sunday edition began on October 4, 1959.

== Characters and story ==
Mr. Mum is a portly, bald and bespectacled character, who — as his name suggests — remains mum as he observes various odd, surprising or even surreal scenes. He is sometimes accompanied by his similarly silent dog. Mum is described as a "bystander on life's outer limits," and the feature's "anything-can-happen" humor paved the way for later titles like Herman, The Far Side, Bizarro and Rhymes With Orange.

Because it was a pantomime cartoon, its humor translated well internationally. Dutch comics historian Ger Apeldoorn noted that Mr. Mum was "one of the weirdest of the silent strips (excluding the Dutch masterpiece from the same period, Professor Pi by Bob van der Born). . . . Mr. Mum is a curious man in a weird world, who never gets involved but only observes with ever growing amazement."

Irving Phillips' The Strange World of Mr. Mum (1965).

After the feature ceased publication, Phillips created a few dozen large, full-color paintings based on ideas from the comic series.

== Printing in other languages ==
In the second half of the 20th century, it was published in Spanish under the name El extraño mundo de Subuso.

== See also ==
- The Angriest Dog in the World
- Virgil Partch
- Dan Piraro
