= Song of the Open Road =

1944 film by S. Sylvan Simon

- Directed by: S. Sylvan Simon
- Written by: Albert Mannheimer
- Story by: Irving Phillips; Edward Verdier
- Produced by: Charles R. Rogers
- Starring: Edgar Bergen; Charlie McCarthy; Bonita Granville; W.C. Fields; Sammy Kaye; Jane Powell; Peggy O'Neill; Jackie Moran; Bill Christy; Reginald Denny; Regis Toomey; Rose Hobart; Pat Starling; Condos Brothers; Hollywood Canteen Kids; Catron & Popp
- Cinematography: John W. Boyle
- Edited by: Truman K. Wood
- Music by: Charles Previn
- Distributed by: United Artists
- Release date: June 1944
- Running time: 93 minutes
- Country: United States
- Language: English

Song of the Open Road is a 1944 musical comedy film directed by S. Sylvan Simon, from a screenplay by Irving Phillips and Edward Verdier. It was the debut film of teenage singer Jane Powell. Powell's real name was Suzanne Burce, but prior to the release of this film MGM assigned her the stage name "Jane Powell" (the name of the character she portrays in this film).

== Plot ==
The movie follows Tess, a teenage girl who dreams of becoming a singer but is overshadowed by her famous country-music star mother, Erica. Wanting a normal life and the chance to prove herself, Tess secretly joins her mother on a summer concert tour—disguised as a backup singer.

== Cast ==
- Jane Powell as Jane Powell
- Bonita Granville as Bonnie
- Peggy O'Neill as Peggy
- Jackie Moran as Jack Moran
- Bill Christy as Bill
- Reginald Denny as Director Curtis
- Regis Toomey as Connors
- Rose Hobart as Mrs. Powell
- Sig Arno as Spolo
- Edgar Bergen as Edgar
- Charlie McCarthy as Charlie
- W. C. Fields as himself
- Sammy Kaye and His Orchestra as Themselves
- Frank, Harry and Steve Condos as Condos Brothers
- The Lipham Four as The Lipham Four
- Irene Tedrow as Miss Casper
- Pat Starling as Pat
- Hollywood Canteen Kids as Themselves
- Catron & Popp as Themselves

== Production ==
Director S. Sylvan Simon had difficulty filming scenes with W. C. Fields because of Fields' alcoholism.

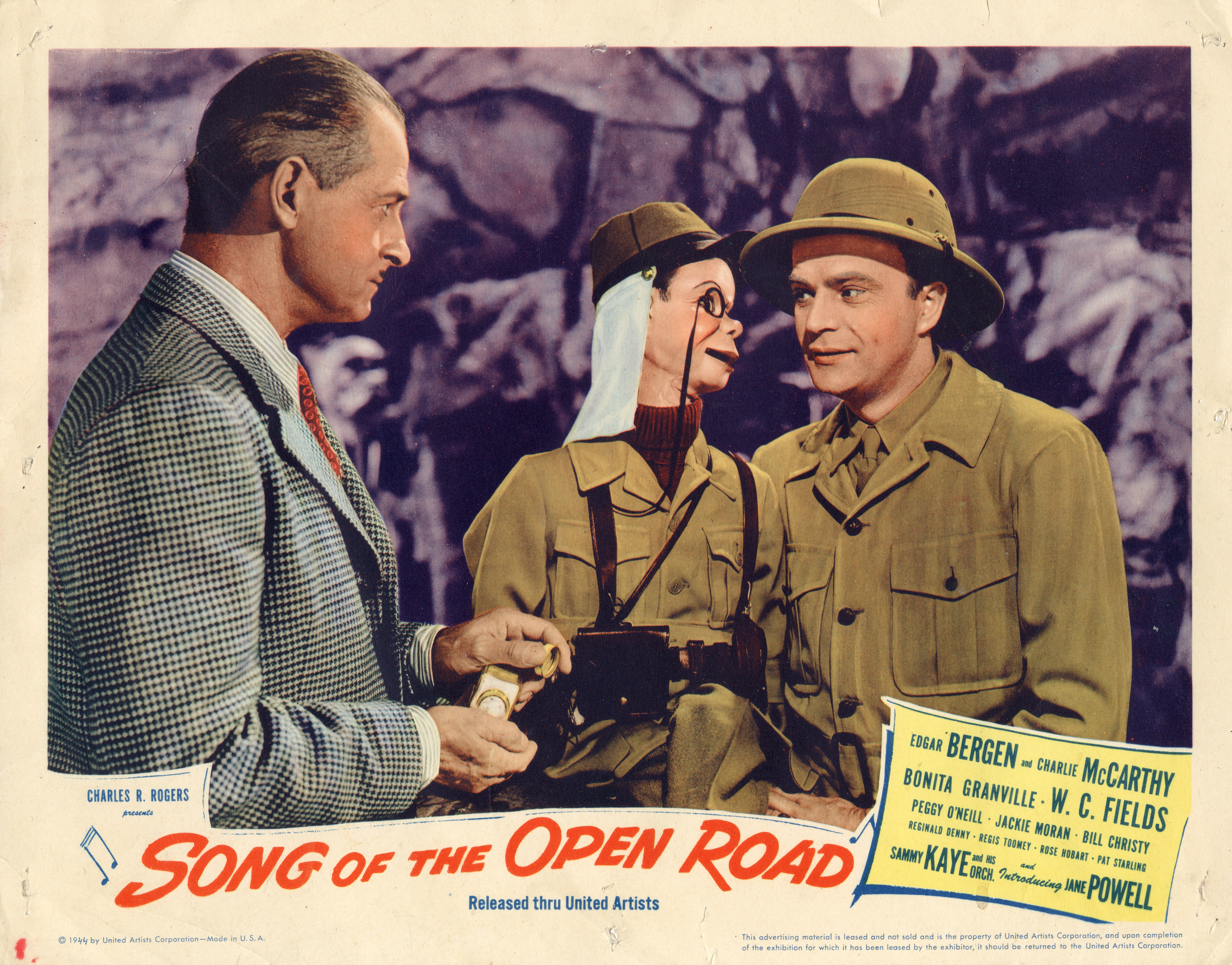
Lobby card

Although Fields often made fun of singers and singing in general, he had a fondness for the promising young singer Jane Powell and even referred to her (as "little Janie Powell") on one of his CBS radio broadcasts (preserved on transcription discs). Powell sang several songs in the film and made such an impression that MGM signed her to a contract to make a number of musical comedies for them, through the mid-1950s.

Location shooting was done in Palm Springs, California and at the Pan-Pacific Auditorium in Los Angeles.

This was W. C. Fields's next-to-last film; his last (Sensations of 1945) would be released only 9 days after this film was issued. In the film, Fields—who began his career as an accomplished juggler—plays himself and juggles some oranges for a few moments. He remarks "This used to be my racket". Then, missing a catch, he drops the oranges and walks away muttering "used to be my racket, but it isn't anymore!"

The film also has a brief continuation of the long-running feud between Fields and woodenhead dummy Charlie McCarthy with a new twist: "Charlie McCarthy Jr." is a miniature version of the dummy that sits on the larger dummy's knee with Charlie as his ventriloquist. The sight of this has Fields throwing away his bottle and vowing to give up drinking.

The film's copyright was renewed in 1971. (Note: Under R507035)

== Award nominations ==
Year	Result	Award	Category	Recipient
1945	Nominated	Academy Award	Best Music, Original Song ("Too Much in Love")	Walter Kent (Music) & Kim Gannon (Lyrics)
1945	Nominated	Academy Award	Best Music, Scoring of a Musical Picture	Charles Previn
1945	Nominated	Academy Award	Best Art Direction, Black and White	N/A (nomination withdrawn)
