= Farley (comic strip) =

American comic strip by Phil Frank

- Author: Phil Frank
- Current status/schedule: Concluded
- Launch date: 1975
- End date: 2007
- Alternate name: Travels With Farley
- Syndicate(s): Chronicle Features (1975–1985)
- Publisher: San Francisco Chronicle
- Genre(s): Humor, Teens, Adults

Farley was an American comic strip written and drawn by Phil Frank, which appeared daily (except Saturday) in the San Francisco Chronicle.

== Publication history ==
The strip began in 1975 as Travels With Farley, a play on John Steinbeck's Travels with Charley. Farley began as a nationally syndicated strip with Chronicle Features, but Frank missed the "timeliness and joy of doing local politics" and, dissatisfied with the four-to-six week lead time required of syndication, in 1985 switched to working exclusively for the Chronicle, which enabled him to quickly mine local events—usually overnight—for his satire.

Phil Frank died on September 12, 2007, shortly after announcing, on September 9, that he was retiring due to illness. Reprints of the strip had been running for some months before this, as he had been too ill to work.

== Outline ==
Farley is a satire of life in the San Francisco Bay Area and California. The title character is Farley, a reporter for the San Francisco Daily Requirement. The strip poked fun at current events in San Francisco, often lampooning such events as the response to Mayor Gavin Newsom's temporary legalization of gay marriage as well as national events such as the National Do Not Call Registry or Vice President Dick Cheney.

The strip also kept track of the current situation of the San Francisco Giants baseball team through the actions of Alphonse, one of the urban bears who is obsessed with the team. Alphonse was often shown leaving a hot dog and a beer at home plate in the middle of the night as an offering to the baseball gods.

== Cast ==
The strip's cast grew so much that Farley, the title character, appeared infrequently. The usual cast was:

- Farley, a reporter for the San Francisco Daily Requirement newspaper.
- Bruce, a right-wing raven who lives with Farley.
- Baba Rebop, later updated to Baba Rebok, mystic and the Prophet of Ocean Beach.
- A quartet of urban California black bears who run a restaurant for animals called the Fog City Dumpster. The bears originally came from Asphalt State Park and followed Farley to San Francisco. They go on summer vacation to Yosemite National Park. The bears include:
  - Floyd, the Fog City Dumpster cook.
  - Alphonse, a die-hard San Francisco Giants fan.
  - Franklin, who often wears a sombrero and bandoleers.
  - Brunhilda, a female with a crush on Farley.
- The Feral Cat Colony
  - Orwell, a feral cat in Golden Gate Park who always is trying to get rich, sometimes by writing to Vice President Dick Cheney with new schemes.
  - Speedbump, a feral cat, Orwell's assistant.
- Miles, mild-mannered dog host of KFUR, a radio station for dogs and cats.
- Velma Melmac, a housewife who parks her monster RV in Yosemite National Park each summer, doing her best to keep nature at bay by, for example, vacuuming the nature trails.
- Beppo, a homeless Vietnam vet, and North Beach sidewalk resident

== Books ==
A number of the strips have been collected and published as books.

- Travels with Farley (1978)
- Asphalt State Park (1987)
- Going Local with Farley (1991)
- I'm Ink, Therefore I Am (1997) - A collection of comics from when Farley became specific to the San Francisco Chronicle.
- Fur and Loafing in Yosemite (1999) (For the Yosemite Association) - A collection of cartoons which were all either set in Yosemite or featured the bears coming or going to Yosemite.
- Don't Parade On My Reign (2003) - A collection of comics featuring "Da Mayor" Willie Brown. Willie Brown was proud of this collection and often autographed and sent it to people.
- Eat Drink & Be Hairy (2006) (For the Yosemite Association) - A second collection of cartoons set in Yosemite.
