= Jere Fields =

American actress

- Occupation: Actress
- Years active: 1972–1989

Jere Fields is an American former actress.

== Career ==
As a child, she guest-starred on such iconic television programs as Gunsmoke and The Brady Bunch. She also starred on the children's educational TV show Curiosity Shop in 1971 and 1972 and did voice work for the animated series Kid Superpower Hour with Shazam! in 1981, as well as Scooby and Scrappy-Doo. She also appeared in several of Rick James' videos. Additionally, she worked on the films Friday the 13th: A New Beginning (1985) and Body Slam (1986).

== Filmography ==
=== Film ===
Year	Title	Role	Notes
1985	Friday the 13th: A New Beginning	Anita	
1986	Body Slam	Lady on Bus	

=== Television ===
Year	Title	Role	Notes
1970	Gunsmoke	Merilee Biggs	Episode: "The Scavengers"
1971	Aesop's Fables	Marta	Television film
1973	The Brady Bunch	Shirley	Episode: "Miss Popularity"
1979	Scooby-Doo and Scrappy-Doo	Additional voices	
1981	Hero High	Misty Magic	26 episodes
1982	CHiPs	DMV Cashier	Episode: "Bright Flashed"
1982	The Facts of Life	Georgia	Episode: "Starstruck"
1983	Diff'rent Strokes	Wendy	Episode: "Mr. T and mr. t"
1984	TLC	Beth	Television film
1985	The Jeffersons	Janay	Episode: "Last Dance"
1985	No Complaints!	Secretary	Television film
1985	T. J. Hooker	Geege	Episode: "Death Is a Four Letter Word"
1985	Cheers	Nurse Brenda	Episode: "Dark Imaginings"
1986, 1987	What's Happening Now!!	Jackie / Tracy	2 episodes
1987	Dads	Kim	Episode: "Waiting"
