= Earthweek =

- Earthweek logo
- Type: Environmental column
- Format: Graphics and text
- Owner: Earth Environment Service
- Publisher: Through Universal Press Syndicate
- Editor: Steve Newman
- Founded: January 2, 1988
- Language: English
- Headquarters: Pilot Point, Texas
- Circulation: Nearly 100 newspapers worldwide
- Website: www.earthweek.com

Earthweek—A Diary of the Planet is a weekly syndicated newspaper column created by Steve Newman. It reports on events in Earth's natural history.

== Content ==
Earthweek provides a weekly overview of headline events affecting the planet—cyclones, floods, brushfires, oil spills and climate change. Other stories are a bit more unusual—monkey attacks, snake infestations and other phenomena as diverse as nature itself.

Earthweek initially focused mainly on breaking weather news stories, along with a complement of items about volcanic eruptions, El Niño outbreaks and unusual animal stories. That focus has widened in recent years to be more inclusive of global warming issues and how wildlife is reacting to the changing climate.

== Format ==
The feature was the first fully paginated newspaper column to be distributed with placed graphics, thanks to the growing popularity of the Macintosh computer platform in newspaper graphics departments during the late 1980s.

Due to the slow modem speeds common in 1988, early versions of Earthweek were limited to low-resolution graphics. Subscribing newspapers maintained a library of individual icons and the base map, which were used by the "wire frame" of the PageMaker document distributed to them each week. Earthweek is now created in QuarkXPress with Adobe Illustrator graphics, and is delivered as a complete, integrated package.

A PDF version of the feature may be downloaded by readers in markets where Earthweek is not published.

== Distribution ==
The feature premiered in the San Francisco Chronicle on Saturday, January 2, 1988, and began syndication through the now-defunct Chronicle Features in early September of that year.

Earthweek moved briefly to Universal Press Syndicate in 1998, when Andrews McMeel Universal purchased Chronicle Features. Author Steve Newman moved the column to the Los Angeles Times Syndicate in June 1998, where its circulation increased and an online version was created.

A subsequent purchase of that syndicate by the Tribune Company absorbed Earthweek into Tribune Media Services, which discontinued the online version and oversaw a steady decline in the column's print subscriptions and sales.

Earthweek rejoined Universal Press Syndicate in June 2003, and is now published by nearly 100 newspapers worldwide. An interactive version was launched by Uclick in July 2006.

== Use in education ==
Educators use the feature in a weekly assignment to elementary and middle school students. By encouraging a close examination of Earthweek's map and summaries, students can increase their understanding of both geography and the environment. Educator Lori Agan wrote an essay in the National Science Teachers Association journal Science Scope that documents how her use of Earthweek has benefited her students.

== Author ==

Earthweek is produced by Steve Newman, a broadcast meteorologist for more than 30 years and a frequent contributor for ABC's Good Morning America.

His Earth Alert bulletins were a weekly component of Discovery News on the Discovery Channel, and an online feature of Discovery.com.

in 1980 Newman established Earth Environment Service, a weather consulting company that provided forecasts and data to agricultural, insurance and media interests worldwide.

Newman is a member of the American Meteorological Society and a fellow of the Royal Meteorological Society. He has also been active in the United Nations World Meteorological Organization and is a member of the National Association of Science Writers.
