= Steve Condos =

American dancer (1918–1990)

- Born: October 12, 1918; Pittsburgh, Pennsylvania, U.S.
- Died: September 16, 1990 (aged 71); Lyon, France
- Occupation: Tap dancer
- Relatives: Nick Condos (brother); Frank Condos (brother); Martha Raye (sister-in-law)

Steve Condos (October 12, 1918 in Pittsburgh, Pennsylvania – September 16, 1990 in Lyon, France) was an American tap dancer. He was a member of the Condos Brothers, with siblings Nick and Frank.

The Condos Brothers are credited in the film Wake Up and Live (1937), in which two of the brothers are introduced by orchestra leader Ben Bernie and dance two tap routines. They were also credited in the film Moon Over Miami (1941), as specialties.

Condos danced in the films Song of the Open Road (1944), Meet Me After the Show (1951), Tap (1989) and others. He collaborated with Jimmy Slyde on a program of jazz tap improvisation at the Smithsonian Institution during the 1980s.

He created the tap rudiments, based on the drum rudiments used by drummers.

Condos died at 71 of a heart attack, in Lyon, France, in a dressing room of the Maurice Ravel auditorium shortly after performing at the Lyon International Dance Biennial.

He met his wife, Eileen Earl, in an air raid shelter.

He was the brother-in-law of Martha Raye, who was married to his brother, Nick Condos.
