= Art Hoppe =

American humorist

- Hoppe in 1994
- Born: Arthur Watterson Hoppe; April 23, 1925; Honolulu
- Died: February 1, 2000 (aged 74); San Francisco
- Occupation: newspaper columnist

Arthur Watterson Hoppe (April 23, 1925 – February 1, 2000) was a popular columnist for the San Francisco Chronicle for more than 40 years. He was known for satirical and allegorical columns that skewered the self-important. Many columns featured whimsical characters such as expert-in-all-things Homer T. Pettibone and a presidential candidate named Nobody. Occasionally, Hoppe reined in his humor for poignant columns on serious topics, such as "To Root Against Your Country," a noted 1971 column against the Vietnam War.

== Career ==
Hoppe began at the Chronicle as a copy boy in 1949 and was promoted to reporter before beginning his own column. As a reporter, he scooped other papers by skiing out with a photographer to the City of San Francisco train when it became snowbound in the Sierra in January 1952. At the peak of its popularity, Hoppe's column appeared in the Chronicle five days a week and was syndicated in more than 100 newspapers nationwide. His close friends included fellow columnists Russell Baker and Art Buchwald. He was portrayed as a knight wearing a full suit of armor in humorous situations pertaining to the subject matter in Phil Frank illustrations that accompanied his columns from November 1989 to his death in 2000.

Hoppe received the Lifetime Achievement Award from the National Society of Newspaper Columnists in 1996. On his own initiative, he released fellow Chronicle columnist Herb Caen from a mutual vow to accept a special 1996 Pulitzer Prize. He died from complications of lung cancer in February 2000, aged 74, survived by his wife Gloria and four children.

== Publications ==
- The Love Everybody* Crusade (* Except Antarcticans) (Doubleday, 1963)
- Dreamboat, novel (Doubleday, 1964)
- Our San Francisco, contributor with Kenneth Rexroth & others (Diablo Press 1964)
- The Perfect Solution to Absolutely Everything (Doubleday, 1968)
- Mr Nixon, and My Other Problems (Chronicle Books, 1971)
- Miss Lollipop and the Doom Machine, novel (Doubleday, 1973)
- Tiddling Tennis (Viking, 1977)
- The Marital Arts (Arbor House, 1985)
- Humor, Hope, and Humanity's Future (Nuclear Age Peace Foundation, 1987)
- Having a Wonderful Time: My First Half Century as a News Paper Man, memoir (Chronicle Books 1995)
- Above San Francisco, photography by Robert Cameron (Cameron & Co., 1998)

According to an obituary he also wrote two plays, including The Endless Autumn.
