= Art Finley =

American cartoonist (1926–2015)

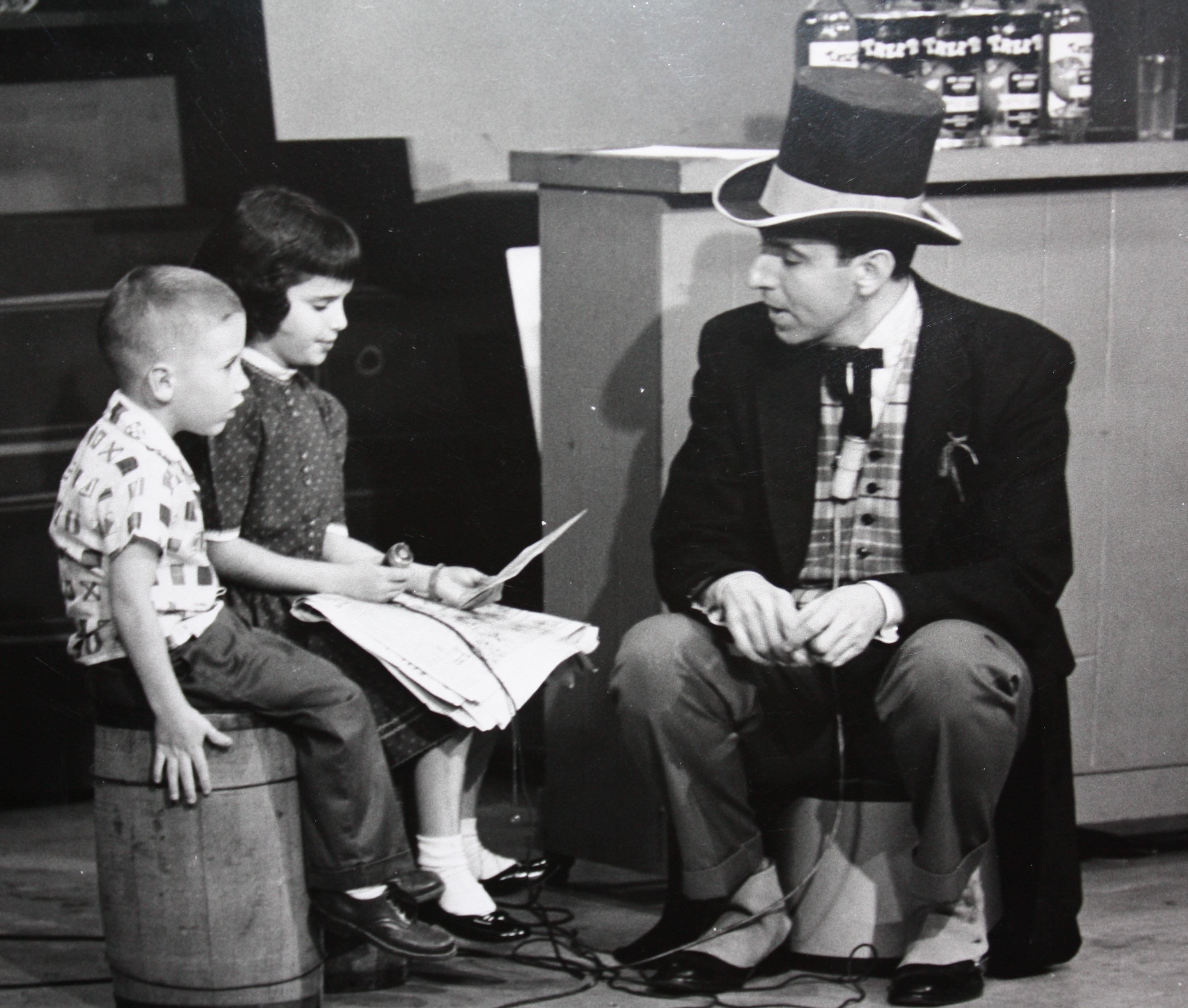
- Mayor Art and Cheri Block
- Born: Arthur Finger; 1926; Fairmont, West Virginia, U.S.
- Died: August 7, 2015 (aged 88–89); Vancouver, British Columbia
- Occupation: TV/Radio Anchor
- Years active: 1943-1995
- Spouse: Geraldine (1950–2006)

Art Finley (born Arthur Finger; 1926 – August 7, 2015) was an American television and radio personality, mostly in San Francisco and Vancouver, until his retirement in 1995.

His broadcasting career began at KXYZ in Houston in 1943. He enlisted in the U.S. Army Air Corps during World War II, and in the Korean War, he was recalled to active duty as a reserve officer in the U.S. Air Force, where he helped establish radio stations in Newfoundland and Greenland for the Strategic Air Command. Afterward, he worked in New York City in TV and radio. He moved to Stockton, California in the mid-1950s, to host a children's program, Toonytown, on KOVR-TV, where he remained until 1958.

He is widely remembered as "Mayor Art," the host of a live children's show, featuring "Popeye" cartoons, that aired weekday afternoons on KRON-TV in San Francisco beginning in 1959 through 1966. Dressed in a top hat and a morning coat, he addressed his live audience of attendant children, who wore similar top hats, as the "city council." Each program featured a short science segment; and in between Popeye cartoons, Finley used a hand puppet, "Ringading," to teach introductory French, Spanish, German, and Italian words and phrases. The show's catchphrase, echoed by the City Council in every episode was "Bluey, Bluey" which may have related to Art's time in Greenland, where airfields are known as bluie. The traditional close to each show was "I'll be seeing you subsequently.".

He would have one of the kids from the audience come up and haphazardly draw a line on a blackboard, which Mayor Art would then complete by continuing it into a cartoon or real-world object.

"Mayor Art's Almanac" was the first TV newscast for children in the U.S., and the State of California awarded him two gold medals for the feature, in 1963 and 1965. The Mayor Art character was partly a way of introducing young people to civic matters, which, in retrospect, revealed Finley's true interests and foreshadowed his later career as a radio talk show host. When the Mayor Art Show ended in the summer of 1966, Finley joined KRON-TV's news department as a reporter and producer-host of "Speak Out," a weekly political interview program, until 1968.

During the last half of his 50-year career, Finley returned to radio as a newsman and talk-show host. He relied on his wife Geraldine as his career advisor, researcher and editor throughout their 56-year marriage. She died in 2006.

In the U.S., Finley's station affiliations were primarily in San Francisco: 10 years at KGO, and KCBS. Three interim years were spent at XTRA in San Diego and WNIS in Norfolk. Two radio stations in Vancouver, B.C., needed a talk-show host with U.S. experience and a knowledge of Canadiana, and Finley spent five years at CKNW, and later, six years at CJOR. He retired in 1995; his final years in broadcasting were as a KCBS news anchor.

While living in Canada, Finley contributed many news stories and features from that country and Europe, as a byline writer for the San Francisco Chronicle Foreign Service.

Art Finley served as Master of Ceremonies for San Francisco's official celebration of Independence Day for 14 years between 1960 and 1979.

From 1962 to 1981, the San Francisco Chronicle and scores of other North American newspapers published his syndicated daily panel "Art's Gallery", consisting of 19th Century woodcuts, to which Finley had written humorous modern-day captions. All 6200+ original panels are now in the archives of San Francisco State University.

On February 12, 2002, Finley donated tapes of 100 of his memorable radio interviews, to the University of British Columbia Library's Rare Books and Special Collections.

Finley died of a heart attack on August 7, 2015.
