= Bizarro (comic strip) =

Cartoon by Dan Piraro

- Dan Piraro's Bizarro daily (September 2, 2008)
- Author(s): Dan Piraro; Wayne "Wayno" Honath (2018–present)
- Current status/schedule: Running gag panel
- Launch date: January 21, 1985; 41 years ago
- Syndicate(s): Chronicle Features (1985–1995); Universal Press Syndicate (1995–2003); King Features Syndicate (2003-present)
- Genre: surrealist humor

Bizarro is a single-panel cartoon written and drawn by American cartoonist Dan Piraro and later by cartoonist Wayne "Wayno" Honath. The cartoon specializes in surrealist humor and at times is slightly cryptic in its humor. The creator often includes hidden symbols in the drawing that refer to inside jokes or other elements.

== Publication history ==
Launched January 21, 1985, the panel appears daily in 350 markets throughout North and South America, Europe and Asia. Initially syndicated by Chronicle Features, it moved to the Universal Press Syndicate in 1995 and then King Features Syndicate in 2003.

On January 1, 2018, Piraro's friend and colleague Wayne "Wayno" Honath took over creative duties on the daily strip, with Piraro continuing to do the Sunday strip. Honath had collaborated on writing the strip since 2009, and drew it for a few previous stretches.

== Characters and story ==
Bizarro offers an eccentric, exaggerated and, as the name implies, bizarre look at everyday life. Piraro described it as "about the incredibly surreal things that happen to all of us in our so-called 'normal' lives." The situations are surreal, yet often plausible. Some cartoons involve celebrities, while others make reference to themselves or characters from comics or animation (such as Superman and Gumby). Comics critic Tom Heintjes described Bizarro's themes, cryptic aspects and expansion into performance art:

Piraro has taken his panel in directions simultaneously surreal and topical. In a comic universe where world-weary talking dogs exist alongside nihilistic housewives, Piraro gives his cartoons heft by skewering his own bêtes noires: wasteful consumerism, environmental destruction, corporate greed and sheeplike people, to name a few. (He also espouses animal rights in his work, for which the Humane Society honored him in January with its Genesis Award.) Though his humor is never didactic, Piraro's work is remarkable in its unwillingness to pander, even when the occasional panel borders on the inscrutable. (For example, he once used the Etruscans as a punchline; if you skipped history class that day, tough.) The 54-year-old Kansas City, Missouri, native has also begun participating in the nascent vaudeville revival with his one-man Bizarro Bologna Show, an entertainment potpourri into which he incorporates puppetry, song, ventriloquism, mind reading and drawing (not to mention slides of Bizarro cartoons too blue for newspaper publication). Creatively restive, Piraro also produces fine art, some of which uses the Catholic imagery that he was exposed to at parochial school.

== Hidden symbols ==
Dan Piraro's Bizarro Sunday (March 8, 2009), depicting Gumby and Pokey.

Most Bizarro cartoons since 1995 include one or more of these elements hidden somewhere in the cartoon:

- an eyeball (the Eyeball of Observation),
- a piece of pie (the Pie of Opportunity),
- a rabbit (the Bunny of Exuberance),
- an alien in a spaceship (the Flying Saucer of Possibility),
- the abbreviation "K2" (referring to Piraro's children Kaitlin and Killian),
- a crown (the Crown of Power),
- a stick of dynamite (the Dynamite of Unintended Consequences),
- a shoe (the Lost Loafer),
- an arrow (The Arrow of Vulnerability),
- a fish tail (The Fish of Humility)
- an upside down bird (the Inverted Bird)
- Olive Oyl, or the abbreviation "O2" (the Mighty Oyl) (first occurrences in May 2017)
- a smoker's pipe (the Pipe of Ambiguity), added 01/01/2021

As of 2008, Piraro indicates how many symbols are hidden in each strip with a number above his signature.

== Awards ==
The strip and its creator have received several awards, including the National Cartoonists Society's Newspaper Panel Cartoon Award (1999, 2000 and 2001). They were nominated for the NCS Reuben Award each year from 2002 to 2010, finally winning in 2010.

In 2005, Piraro was seen in the 75th anniversary edition of Blondie.

== See also ==
- The Far Side
- The Strange World of Mr. Mum
- Rhymes with Orange
- Virgil Partch
- Zippy
