= Dan Piraro =

American cartoonist, painter, writer, and performer (born 1958)

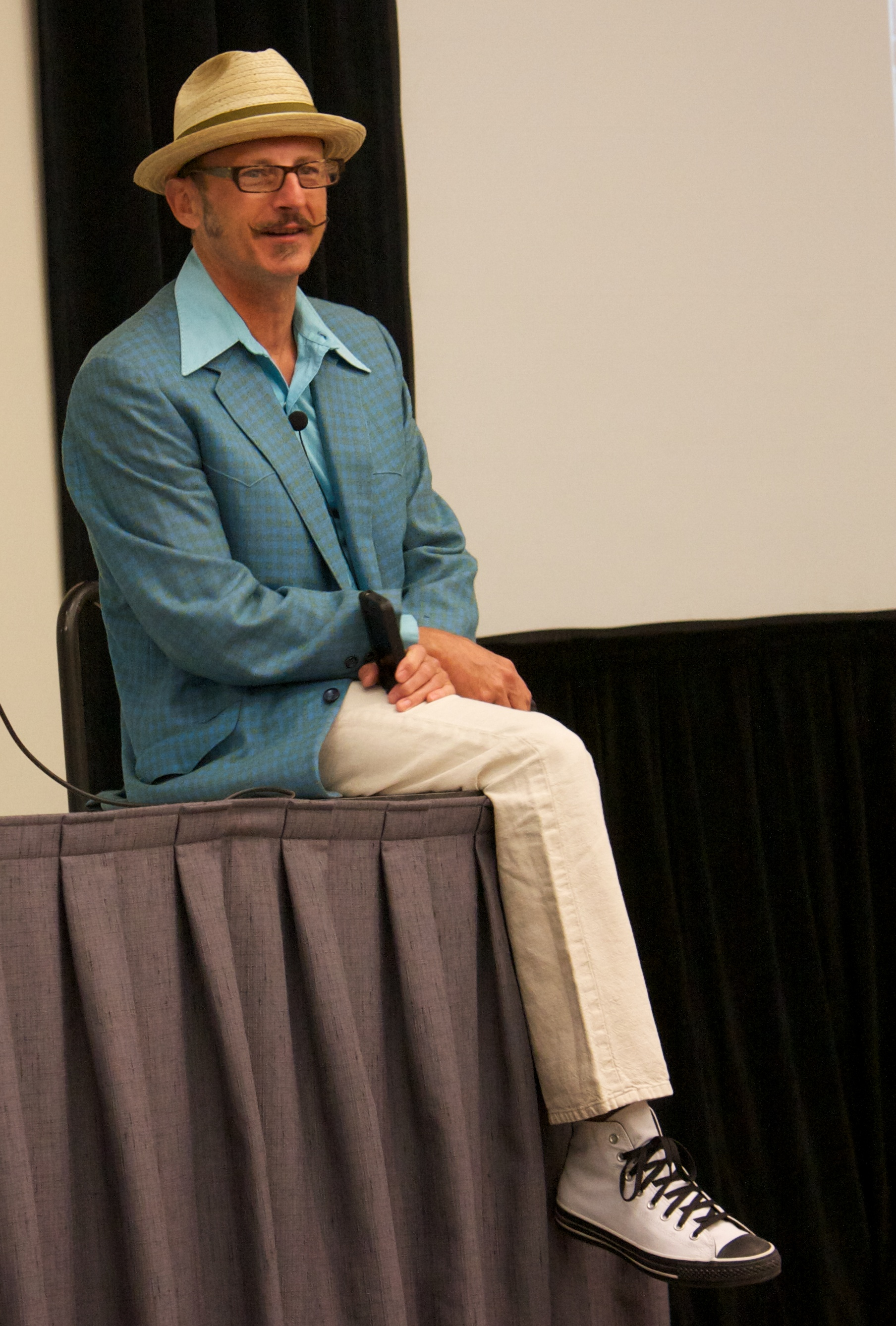
- Dan Piraro at the 2012 Comic-Con
- Born: October 1958 (age 68) Kansas City, Missouri, U.S.
- Areas: Cartoonist, painter, writer, performer
- Notable works: Bizarro
- Awards: New York International Fringe Festival Best Solo Show (2002); Reuben Award (2010)

Daniel Charles Piraro (born October 1958), is a painter, illustrator, and cartoonist best known for his syndicated cartoon panel Bizarro. Piraro's cartoons have been reprinted in 16 book collections (as of 2012). He has also written three books of prose.

== Biography ==
Piraro was born in Kansas City, Missouri, and his family moved to Ponca City, Oklahoma when he was 4 years old. When he was in junior high school his family moved to Tulsa, where he graduated from Booker T. Washington High School in 1976.

He dropped out of Washington University in St. Louis. He lived in Dallas and New York City for many years. He had two daughters with his first wife, and later married Ashley Lou Smith. After they divorced, he moved to Los Angeles, California. On October 30, 2016, he announced that he and his partner 'Olive Oyl' (or "O2") had purchased a house in Mexico and would be residing there beginning December 2016. Syndicated since 1985, Bizarro was appearing in 250 papers by 2006.

In 2014, he hosted the Fox reality television show Utopia.

Piraro has written a graphic novel, Peyote Cowboy, a story of magical realism in the Old West. He is posting it online as it is being illustrated.

== Political views ==
Piraro describes himself as "liberal and progressive politically" and identifies as spiritual but non-religious.". His work has garnered occasional complaints, as in 2005 when he offered newspapers a politics-free version of a comic supporting gay rights. A glitch however meant that papers printing in color received the political version while those in black and white received its tamer counterpart.

In 2007, Piraro designed a limited edition T-shirt for endangeredwear.com to raise money for the Woodstock Farm Animal Sanctuary, a non-profit organization committed to ending the systematic abuse of animals used for food.

In a 2011 interview with This Land Press, Piraro discussed his challenges as a liberal growing up in Tulsa, OK.

== Awards ==
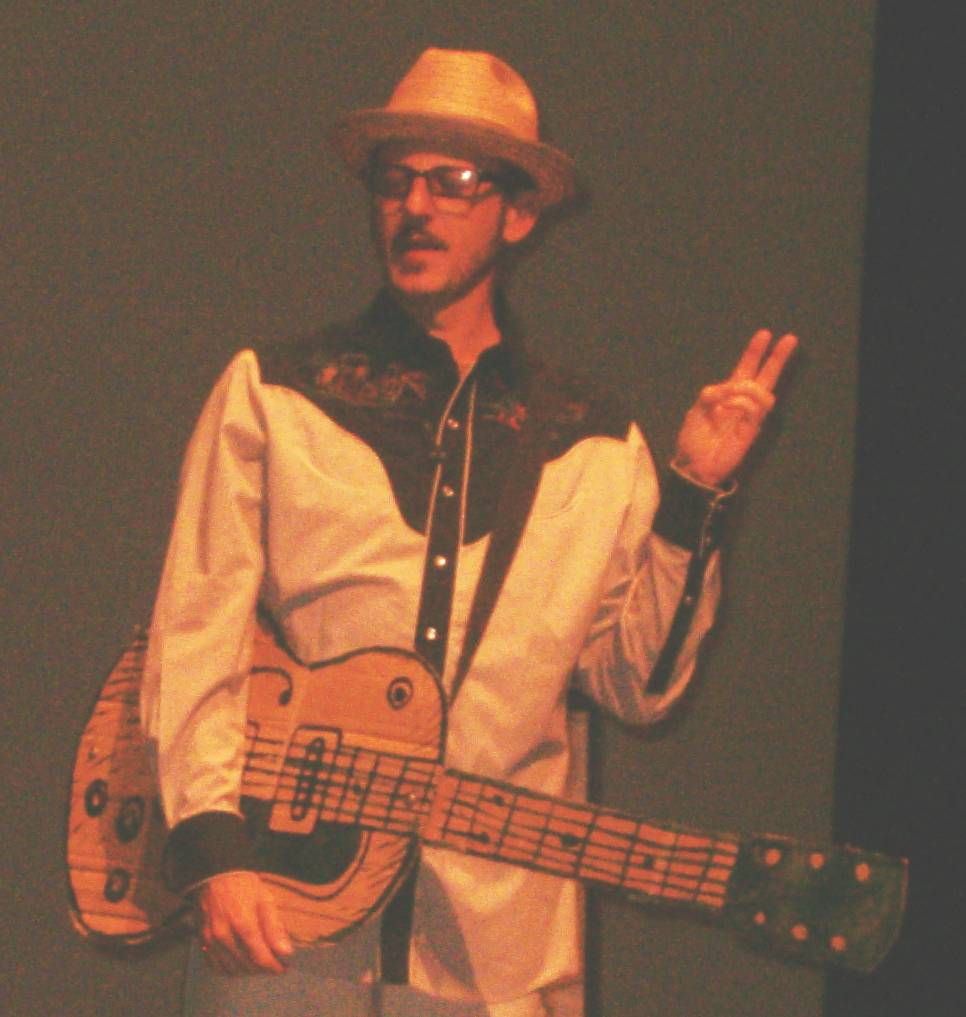
Dan Piraro with a cardboard guitar at NAVS Vegetarian Summerfest 2006

Since 2001, Piraro has toured the U.S. with his one-man comedy show, The Bizarro Baloney Show, which won the 2002 New York International Fringe Festival's award for Best Solo Show. He played the full show for the final time in 2008, although he has performed bits from the show a few times since then.

Piraro received the National Cartoonists Society's Panel Cartoon Award for 1999, 2000 and 2001. Beginning in 2002, Piraro was nominated every year for the National Cartoonists Society's Reuben Award, as Outstanding Cartoonist of the Year, and he finally was given a Reuben Award in 2010. Editorial cartoonist-illustrator Steve Greenberg commented:

Perhaps they finally gave him the award to get him off the ballot after so many consecutive years on it; the rule (at least since multiple-winner Bill Watterson's Calvin and Hobbes) for the Reuben Award is once-only per creator. In any event, this is overdue recognition of a strip that is among the best drawn (for me, up there with 9 Chickweed Lane and Non Sequitur) and inventive (for me, up there with Liō and Zits). Bizarro has also given the world of comic strips signature icons, such as his ongoing placements of eyeballs, pieces of pie, aliens in space ships and somewhat menacing bunnies. It's the comics world's closest brush with the world of surrealist paintings (and by the way, Piraro is an excellent surrealist painter as well). To me, Bizarro hits heights of offbeat creativity and daily surprises that haven't been seen since Gary Larson and his The Far Side panel. And speaking of panels, Piraro is one of the few creators who makes his daily offering into both a horizontal comic-strip space and a squarer panel format in order to fit more newspapers' space needs.

His graphic novel, Peyote Cowboy, won the National Cartoonists Society's "Best Online Comic-Longform" award in 2021.

== Books ==
Piraro's Bizarro (April 1, 2009)

- Bizarro (1986) ISBN 0877014027
- Too Bizarro (1988) ISBN 0877015368
- Mondo Bizarro (1989) ISBN 0877017115
- Sumo Bizarro (1990) ISBN 0877017743
- Glasnost Bizarro (1990) ISBN 0877016933
- The Book of Lame Excuses (1991) ISBN 0877017735
- Post-Modern Bizarro (1991) ISBN 0877018545
- Best of Bizarro (1992) ISBN 0811802760
- Best of Bizarro II (1994) ISBN 0811807711
- Bizarro #9 (1995) ISBN 0836204301
- Bizarro #10 (1996) ISBN 0836222350
- Bizarro Among the Savages: A Relatively Famous Guy's Experiences on the Road and in the Homes of Strangers (1997) ISBN 0836221737
- Life Is Strange and So Are You: A Bizarro Sunday Treasury (2001) ISBN 0740718487
- The Three Little Pigs Buy the White House (2004) ISBN 031233074X
- Bizarro and Other Strange Manifestations of the Art of Dan Piraro (2006) ISBN 0810992213
- Bizarro Buccaneers: Nuttin' but Pirate Cartoons (2008) ISBN 0740777408
- Bizarro Heroes (2011) ISBN 0867197560
- Creative Haven Bizarro Land Coloring Book (2016) ISBN 0486808688

=== Audiobook narrator ===
- Author – Daniel J. Levitin (2016). A Field Guide to Lies (a.k.a. Weaponized Lies: How to Think Critically in the Post-Truth Era); ISBN 978-1524702526, OCLC 934676963, ASIN B06XCLKYTG
