= Phil Frank =

American cartoonist

- Born: March 27, 1943; Pittsburgh, Pennsylvania, United States
- Died: September 12, 2007 (aged 64); Bolinas, California, United States
- Occupations: Artist, Comic Creator
- Known for: Creating Farley, The Elderberries comics and making baseball caps

Phil Frank (March 27, 1943 – September 13, 2007) was an American cartoonist best known as the creator of the political-satirical San Francisco-based comic strip Farley and the artist on nationally syndicated comic strip The Elderberries.

== Works ==
In addition to his Farley comic strip, Frank collaborated with writer Joe Troise on several comic strip projects:

- Chateau Defeat (published in the Wine Spectator)
- Miles to Go
- Nigel Shiftright, Automotive Anachronism for Road & Track magazine
- The eponymous Frank and Troise also for Road & Track magazine.
- A series of "Teletoons" for Network World magazine.

== Career ==
Frank started cartooning at Michigan State University first by creating illustrations on classmates jackets and then with the university newspaper for $5 a strip. After graduation and marriage he took a job as an illustrator and humorist with Hallmark Cards in Kansas City, where his son Philip was born. Frank returned to teach at Michigan State for a few years, during which time his daughter Stacy was born. After moving to the Bay Area California in 1973, Frank was an illustrator for a variety of clients including the US Army. He started his syndicated comic strip Travels with Farley while he and his second wife, Susan, lived on a house boat in Sausalito, on San Francisco Bay. During this time his studio was in a pilot's cabin atop a ferry boat docked nearby. When Farley transitioned from a syndicated to a local strip in the San Francisco Chronicle, Frank secured a secret studio atop the Chronicle building where he could covertly create his characters. While at the Chronicle, he also provided illustrations that accompanied columns by Arthur Hoppe who was portrayed as a knight wearing a full suit of armor in humorous situations pertaining to the subject matter from November 1989 to the columnist's death in 2000.

== Other works and Interests ==
In addition to his comic strip work, Frank also worked as an illustrator on many projects during his career on education materials for conservation ("Aunt Energina," the "Electric Gnus,"). He had numerous commercial freelance clients, including the San Francisco Giants and Pet Food Express. He also created some of the first computer-based clip art, and one of his cartoon bears from Asphalt State Park was sold as a popular stuffed animal at California's State Parks alongside his Farley books.

Frank was well known in his home community of Sausalito and served on its Historical Society.

An avid classic car enthusiast since he was a child, Frank restored an Alfa Romeo 2000 GTV, seven Ford Model As, two MG TCs, an MG SA Tickford Drophead, and a Jaguar MKII. His second wife, Susan, collaborated as a writer on several of his publishing projects including children's books. In the summer of 1976, he, along with his wife Susan and the two children, drove a 1929 Model A Four Door with a period-appropriate camper from California to Maine and back all along the back roads of America.

== Retirement and death ==
Frank announced his retirement for health reasons on September 7, 2007 and died shortly thereafter in Bolinas, California. Frank had been suffering from a brain tumor for months before and was gravely ill at the time of the announcement.
