= 1998 in comics =

Notable events of 1998 in comics.

== Events and publications ==
=== January ===
- Specific date unknown: Dutch cartoonist Stefan Verwey wins the Inktspotprijs for Best Political Cartoon. He will win the award again next year.
- La main de la mort and Crime sur Internet by André-Paul Duchâteau and Tibert, 59. and 60. album of the Ric Hochet series (Le Lombard).
- Last issue of the Italian magazine L'intrepido, in the newstads since 1935.
- The Ken Parker series is abruptly interrupted with the episode Faccia di rame (Copper face), by Giancarlo Berardi, Ivo Milazzo and Luca Vannini; the story is inspired by the life of Ishi. The series will get a conclusion only in 2015.

=== February ===
- February 5 : in Anders And & Co., The last lord of Eldorao, by Don Rosa.
- February 8: Superman, distant fires one-shot by Howard Chaykin and Gil Kane (DC Comics)
- February 13: Comic artist Willy Vandersteen receives a statue in Antwerp, Belgium.
- Superman Red/Superman Blue begins.
- Ghost Rider, vol. 3., 1990 series, cancelled by Marvel Comics with issue #93
- First issue of Fathom, by Michael Turner (Top Cow)

=== March ===
- March 11: The Flemish newspapers Het Laatste Nieuws and De Nieuwe Gazet change the title of their weekly children comics supplement De Samson en Gert Krant, based on the popular TV show Samson en Gert, into De Plopkrant, based on the children's show Kabouter Plop.
- March 25: The first episode of Paige Braddock's Jane's World is published. The series will run until 2018.
- Batman: Cataclysm begins.
- Coeur de canard (Duck's heart) – by Lewis Trondheim and Johan Sfarr, first album of the fantasy saga Dungeon (Delcourt).
- L’aventure immobile (The motionless adventure) by Didier Convart and Andrè Juliard (Dargaud), with Blake and Mortimer; first album of the series Le dernier chapitre, showing the heroes of the French comics at the twilight of their lives.

=== April ===
- First issue of Battle chasers by Joe Madueira (Wild Storm)

=== May ===
- May 29: In the Danish magazine Anders And, the first episode of The Black Knight by Don Rosa is published, which marks the debut of Arpin Lusene.
- The first episode of Daniel Clowes' David Boring is prepublished in Eightball.
- Marvel Comics' Identity Crisis begins.
- Batman: Cataclysm concludes.
- 300 by Frank Miller and Lynn Varley (Dark Horse)
- Le jeu de la potence by André-Paul Duchâteau and Tibet, 61. album of the Ric Hochet series (Dargaud).
- Colpo da maestro (Masterstroke) by Moreno Burattini and Gallieno Ferri (Bonelli); the criminal mastermind Mortimer, Zagor’s recurring adversary, makes his debut.

=== Spring ===
- Gay Comix (1980 series), with issue #25, publishes its final issue (Bob Ross)

=== June ===
- June 3: in Spirou, first episode of La Jonque céleste by Roger Leloup.
- Emerald Knights begins.
- Identity Crisis concludes.
- Superman Red/Superman Blue concludes.
- Nato il 31 febbraio (Born February 31) by Claudio Chiaverotti and Massimo Rotundo, first album of the post-apocalyptic series Brendon (Bonelli).

=== July ===
- A family matter by Will Eisner.

=== August ===
- August 3 : in Libération, Le Mystère des profondeurs by Jacques Tard (eight episode of The Extraordinary Adventures of Adèle Blanc-Sec) is prepublished.
- August 24: The Dutch comics magazine Sjosji changes its name again into Sjosji Striparazzi.It will continue until 1999, after which it changes its name into Striparazzi.
- First issue of JLA: The Nail by Alan Davis and Mark Farmer (Elsewords).
- L’orphelin des astres by Pierre Christin and Jean-Claude Mézières (Dargaud).

=== September ===
- September 9: Through a long trial Albert Uderzo wins the profits and rights to all his Asterix-related merchandise and albums from previous publisher Dargaud.
- In Anders And & Co., The sign of the triple distelfink by Don Rosa; the story homages the 50th anniversary of Gladstone Gander’s first apparition.
- First issue of the miniseries Superman for all seasons by Jeph Loeb and Tim Sale (DC Comics).
- Le sommeil du monstre by Enik Bilal (Les Humanoïdes Associés).
- Voir Venise by Jean Van Hamme and Philippe Francq, 9th episode of the series Largo Winch (Dupuis).
- L’inizio (The beginning) by Leo Ortolani and Ade Capone, first album of the cyberpunk series Morgan: La Sacra Ruota.

=== October ===
- October 3: Les Barbares by Jacques Martin and Rafael Morales, 21st album of Alix series (Dargaud)
- October 10–11: During the Stripdagen in Breda Joost Swarte receives the Stripschapprijs. Publisher Hansje Joustra wins the P. Hans Frankfurtherprijs.
- October 14: Dust waltz, graphic novel by Dan Brereton and Hector Gomez (Dark Horse), first comics set in the Buffy universe. The next day, the first issue of the regular Buffy comic series is published, always by Dark Horse.
- Toy Biz buys Marvel Comics
- The "Emerald Knights" storyline concludes
- First issue of the series Mutant X, by Howard Mackie (Marvel).
- The Gathering of Five, taking place over Spider-Man's four main ongoing series
- Daredevil vol. 1, 1964 series, is canceled by Marvel with issue #380
- Excalibur is canceled by Marvel with issue #125
- The Sensational Spider-Man is canceled by Marvel with issue #33
- Gli occhi dell’abisso, (Abyss’ eyes) by Giancarlo Berardi and Luca Vannini (Bonelli), first album of the Julia series. In the story, the heroine must face for the first time her nemesis, the serial killer Myrna Harrod.
- Colui che dimora nelle tenebre (The living in darkness) by Alfredo Castelli, Vincenzo Beretta and Erasmo Dante Spada (Bonelli); first episode of the series Storie di Altrove, spin-off of Martin Mystere.
- L’ami Javin, by Serge Le Tendre, Regis Loisel and Lidwine, first album of Apres la quete, second cycle of La Quête de l'oiseau du temps (Dargaud)
- Marcel Dalton by Bob De Groot and Morris, 109th album of Lucky Luke series. The comic is charged of antisemitism, because the caricatural representation of a Jewish banker.

=== November ===
- November 18: The first page of Jerry Holkins and Mike Krahulik's Penny Arcade is uploaded to the Internet.
- November 24: in Topolino, The river of time by Francesco Artibani, Tito Faraci and Corrado Mastrantuono. Published for Mickey Mouse’s 70th birthday, the story is a sequel to his first cartoon, Steamboat Willie,
- 25 November: in Spirou, Machine qui reve (Dreaming machine) by Tome and Janny; the story marks a turning point in Spirou and Fantasio series, that becomes more realistic and less humorous.
- 29 November: Long feu by Metz and Luc Jacamon (Casterman); first album of the series The killer.
- DC One Million takes place.
- The Final Chapter begins and concludes, taking place over Spider-Man's three main ongoing series
- The imprint Marvel Knights debuts with three new titles:
  - Daredevil vol. 2 — the "Guardian Devil" storyline begins
  - Black Panther vol. 3
  - Inhumans vol. 2
- Peter Parker, the Spectacular Spider-Man is canceled by Marvel with issue #263.
- Silver Surfer vol. 2 is canceled by Marvel with issue #146.
- What If vol. 2 is canceled by Marvel with issue #114.
- La solution Pinkerton by Francois Corteggiani and Michel Blanc-Dumont, tenth album of the Blueberry’s youth series (Dargaud); beginning of the “complots’ cycle”.

=== December ===
- December 8: In Topolino, Donald Duckling (Donald Duck as a child) makes his debut in a tale by Paola Mulazzi and Alessandro Barbucci.
- December 11: in Uncle Scrooge, The Cowboy captain of the Cutty Sark by Don Rosa.
- The Hunt for Xavier begins.
- The Amazing Spider-Man and Peter Parker: Spider-Man are both restarted with new #1 issues.
- Il potere di Iside, by Antonio Serra and Antonella Platano, first album of the series Legs e le paladine, spin-off of Nathan Never (Bonelli)

=== Specific date unknown ===
- Jim Lee announced that DC Comics would take over WildStorm Productions.
- MU Press publishes Those Annoying Post Bros. #63, the final issue of that title.
- Hicksville by Dylan Horrocks (Black Eye books)

== Deaths ==
=== January ===
- January 5: Gustavo Martz Schmidt, Spanish comics artist (Toribio Doctor Cascarrabias, El Doctor Cataplasma, Troglodito, Camelio Majareto, El profesor Tragacanto, Deliranta Rococó, La Pandilla Cu-Cux Plaf, El Sherrif Chiquito, continued Doña Urraca), dies at age 75.
- January 7: Eli Bauer, American comics artist and animator (Kermit the Hermit, Norman), dies at age 69.
- January 11: Win Mortimer, American comics artist (co-creator of Ripley's Believe It or Not!), dies at age 78.
- January 18: Adolfo Buylla, Spanish comics artist (Diego Valor, Yago Veloz), dies at age 70 or 71.
- January 28: Shotaro Ishinomori, Japanese manga artist (Kamen Rider, Cyborg 009, Sandarobotchi), dies at age 60 of heart failure.

=== February ===
- February 8: John Miles, British cartoonist and comics artist (Perkins), dies at age 63.
- February 14: Thomas McKimson, American comics artist and animator (Looney Tunes comics, Disney comics, worked on the Roy Rogers comic strip), dies at age 90.
- February 16: Gervy, French comics artist (Pat'Apouf), dies at age 89.
- February 28: Antonio Prohías, Cuban-American comics artist (Spy vs. Spy), dies at age 77.

=== March ===
- March 1: Archie Goodwin, American comics writer (Luke Cage, Manhunter, Secret Agent X-9, Captain Kate, worked for Blazing Combat, Creepy and Eerie) and artist (assisted on Mary Perkins on Stage), dies at age 60.
- March 3: Olaf Stoop, Dutch activist and underground comics artist (Roza's Lotgevallen), dies at age 52 from a heart attack.
- March 23: John Sikela, Slovak-American comics artist (worked on Superman, Superboy), dies at age 90 or 91.

=== April ===
- April 7: Alex Schomburg, Puerto Rican-American comics artist (Timely Comics), dies at age 92.
- April 8:
  - Lee Elias, British-American comics artist (Beyond Mars, Black Cat), dies at age 77.
  - Pellos - French comic artist (Futuropolis, continued Les Pieds Nickelés), dies at age 98.
- April 17: E.E. Hibbard, American painter and comics artist (worked on The Flash, Green Lantern and was the first artist to illustrate a Justice Society story), dies at age 89.
- April 23: Enrique Riverón, Cuban-American cartoonist, animator and comics artist, dies at age 95 or 96.
- April 26: Bill Crooks, American comics artist (assisted on Captain Easy), dies at age 80.
- April 29: Archelaos Antonaros, Greek editorial cartoonist, comic artist (From the Life of the Barrel-Minded, Ntentes, the Football Supporter) and publisher, dies at age 77.

=== May ===
- May 13: Wim den Hollander, Dutch illustrator, actor, photographer, fireman and comic artist (Dobber en Kliekje, Strik en Stropdas), dies at age 89 .

=== June ===
- June 13: Reg Smythe, British comics artist (Andy Capp), dies at age 80.

=== July ===
- July 16: Tony Sgroi, American animator and comics artist (Disney comics), dies at age 73.

=== August ===
- August 1:
  - René Bonnet, French comics artist (Fripounet et Marisette), dies at age 92.
  - Florenci Clavé, Spanish comics artist (Rémy Herphelin), dies at age 62.
  - Sergio Molino, Italian comic artist (made comics for Casa Editrice Impero), dies at age 78.
- August 15: Wim Hessels, A.K.A. Woeloem, Dutch comics artist (Stoffertje Zuig, Manusje van Alles, Boerensloot, Spatje, Muisje Nisje), dies at age 70.
- August 17: Jac. H. Molier, Dutch comic artist and poet (Meneer Vliegwiel, Appie van Gelder, Jan Perseijn, Mijnheer Adriaan), dies at age 94.
- August 20: Robert Rigot, French illustrator, caricaturist and comics artist (Chantal, Frédéri le Gardian, Les Rapaces), dies at age 89.

=== September ===
- September 1: Francisco Coching, Filipino comics artist (Marabini, Hagibis, Sabas, ang Barbaro Pedro Penduko, El Indio), dies at age 86.
- September 3: Vincent Alascia, American comics artist (American Avenger, worked on Captain America), dies at age 84.

=== October ===
- October 28: Les Carroll, American comics artist (The Tillers, Life with the Rimples, assisted Boots and Her Buddies and Alley Oop, continued Our Boarding House), dies at age 86.

=== November ===
- November 2: Enric Sió, Spanish comics artist (La Guerra de los Poetas, Mara, Mis Miedos), dies from a stroke at age 56.
- November 3: Bob Kane, American comic book writer and artist (co-creator of Batman), dies at age 83.
- November 17: Bill Ward, American comics artist (Torchy), dies at age 79.
- November 24: Jacques Eggermont, Belgian comics artist and animator (Bicky, Kaatje en Klopje), dies at age 80.

=== December ===
- December 7: George Wilson, American comics artist (cover artist for Dell Comics and Gold Key Comics), dies at age 77.
- December 10: Ray Goossens, Belgian comics artist (Reynaert de Vos, Ouwe Taaie, Mr. Snor, Tijl Uilenspiegel (sometimes titled Tijl en Lamme), Pimmeke, Snops, Tsjoem) and animator (Musti), dies at age 74.
- December 13: Jean Vern, French musician and comics artist (collaborated with scriptwriter Pierre Christin and comics artist Jacques Lob), dies at age 58.
- December 19: Ron Turner, British comic artist and illustrator (Space Ace, Rick Random, Space Detective, worked on Dan Dare), dies at age 76.
- December 21: André LeBlanc, Haitian-American-Brazilian comics artist (Intellectual Amos, Morena Flor, Our Bible in Pictures, assisted on The Spirit, Flash Gordon, The Phantom), dies at age 77.
- December 23: Joe Orlando, American comics artist (co-creator of the Weird Science, Weird Fantasy series), dies at age 71.
- December 29: Jean-Claude Forest, French comics artist (Barbarella), dies at age 68.
- December 31: Sándor Gugi, Hungarian comics artist (Talál Tamás, Der Arme Leopold, adaptations of literary novels), dies at age 81.
- Specific date unknown: Reginald Ben Davies, British illustrator and comics artist (Jill Crusoe in the Land of the White Queen, Katy of Cedar Creek), dies at age 90 or 91.

=== Specific date unknown ===
- Frank McSavage, Scottish-American comic artist and animator (Disney comics, Walter Lantz comics, Hanna-Barbera comics), dies at age 94 or 95.
- Kim Young-hwan, aka Gita Koji, Korean comics artist (Kojubu Samgukji), dies at age 85 or 86.

== Exhibitions ==
- September 21-December 30: "The Genius of Winsor McCay" (part of the Festival of Cartoon Art) (Ohio State University Cartoon Research Library Reading Room Gallery, 27 West 17th Avenue Mall, Columbus, Ohio)
- October 1–November 13: "Humor in a Jugular Vein: An Expanded Exhibition of the Art, Artists, and Artifacts of MAD Magazine from the Collection of Mark J. Cohen and Rose Marie McDaniel" (part of the Festival of Cartoon Art) (Columbus College of Art and Design Joseph V. Canzani Center, 60 Cleveland Ave., Columbus, Ohio)

== Conventions ==
- January 22–25: Angoulême International Comics Festival (Angoulême, France)
- February 21–22: Alternative Press Expo (San Jose, California)
- March 13–15: MegaCon (Orlando Expo Center, Orlando, Florida, USA) — guests include Stephen Furst and Robin Downs of Babylon 5
- March 21–22: United Kingdom Comic Art Convention (Manchester, England) — guests include Joe Sacco, Alex Ross, Eddie Campbell, Colleen Doran, Woodrow Phoenix, William Messner-Loebs, Alan Grant, and Dave Taylor; presentation of the National Comics Awards; final iteration of the UKCAC
- April 17–19: WonderCon (Oakland, California)
- April 25–26: Pittsburgh Comicon (Pittsburgh ExpoMart, Monroeville, Pennsylvania) — guests include Kevin Smith and Jim Mahfood
- May 15–17: Motor City Comic Con I (Novi Expo Center, Novi, Michigan)
- May 16: Ramapo Comic Con XII (Ramapo High School, Spring Valley, New York) — guests include Barry Blair, Howard Cruse, Evan Dorkin, Sarah Dyer, Dave Cockrum, Joe Quesada, Jimmy Palmiotti, Fred Hembeck, and Amanda Conner
- June 3–5: Heroes Convention (Charlotte Convention Center, Charlotte, North Carolina) — guests include "Trilogy Tour" II members Jeff Smith, Charles Vess, Linda Medley, Mark Crilley, Jill Thompson, and Stan Sakai
- June 13–14: LuluCon II: "Comics: Reaching Out for the Future" (Marriott Hotel, Newark Airport, Newark, New Jersey)
- June 26–28: Fan Expo Canada (Metro Toronto Convention Centre, Toronto, Ontario, Canada) — 6,778 attendees; guests include Joe Quesada, Greg Capullo, Joseph Michael Linsner, Jimmy Palmiotti, Humberto Ramos, Christina Z, Amanda Conner, Chester Brown, Joe Matt, and Seth
- July 17–19: Wizard World Chicago (Rosemont Convention Center, Rosemont, Illinois) — 25,000 attendees; guest of honor: Todd McFarlane; special guests: David Prowse and Kenny Baker; other guests include "Trilogy Tour" II members Jeff Smith, Charles Vess, Linda Medley, Mark Crilley, Jill Thompson, and Stan Sakai
- July 17–18: Zinefest (Los Angeles and Orange, California)
- July 25–26: "The Death of CAPTION" (Oxford Union Society, Oxford, England)
- Aug. 11–12: Pro/Con (San Diego, California) — 6th Pro/Con moves from Oakland to San Diego; held right before Comic-Con International
- August 13–17: Comic-Con International (San Diego Convention Center, San Diego, California) — 42,000 attendees. Special guests include John Broome, Eddie Campbell, Nick Cardy, Mark Crilley, Colleen Doran, Lorenzo Mattotti, Terry Moore, Paul S. Newman, James Robinson, Joe Simon, Paul Smith, Vin Sullivan, Naoko Takeuchi, Chris Ware, and Robert Williams
- September 3–6: Dragon Con (Hyatt Regency Atlanta/ AmericasMart, Atlanta, Georgia) — 18,000 attendees
- September 11–12: Big Apple Comic Con I (Church of St. Paul the Apostle, New York City)
- September 24–27: International Comics and Animation Festival (ICAF) / Small Press Expo (SPX) (Holiday Inn Select, Bethesda, Maryland) — guests include Slim, Strip Core (Igor Prassel & Jacob Klemencic), AMOK (Yvan Alagbé & Olivier Marboeuf), Dylan Horrocks, Will Eisner, Frank Miller, and Actus Tragicus (Rutu Modan, Yirmi Pinkus, Mira Friedmann, Batia Kolton, & Itzik Rennert)
- October 9–10: Festival of Cartoon Art (Ohio State University, Columbus, Ohio) — featured guest speakers are Steve Benson, Brumsic Brandon Jr., Mark J. Cohen, Dave Coverly, Will Eisner, R. C. Harvey, Patrick McDonnell, Jack Ohman, Joel Pett, Victoria Roberts, Ted Rall, Jeff Smith, Art Spiegelman, and Bob Thaves
- October 10: Big Apple Comic Con II (Church of St. Paul the Apostle, New York City)
- October 10–11: Motor City Comic Con II (Dearborn Civic Center, Dearborn, Michigan)
- October 17–18: SuperCon III (Oakland Convention Center, Oakland, California)
- November 13–15: The Graphic Novel: a 20th Anniversary Conference on an Emerging Literary and Artistic Medium (the University of Massachusetts Amherst, Amherst, Massachusetts) — program book features a brief essay by Will Eisner, "Twentieth Anniversary Reflections on A Contract with God"
- November 13–14: Big Apple Comic Con III (Church of St. Paul the Apostle, New York City)
- November 28–29: Mid-Ohio Con (Adam's Mark Hotel, Columbus, Ohio) — guests include "Trilogy Tour" II members Jeff Smith, Charles Vess, Linda Medley, Mark Crilley, Jill Thompson, and Stan Sakai

== First issues by title ==
- Elseworld's Finest: Supergirl & Batgirl
