= Mark J. Cohen =

American comic book collector (1942–1999)

Mark J. Cohen (November 19, 1942 – December 18, 1999) was an American collector of comic books and comic book art, and a prominent cartoonists' agent and dealer in original comics art. He was an occasional contributor to the Gasoline Alley comic strip.

== Biography ==
Cohen was a native of Stockton, California. As a collector of cartoon art, he amassed an estimated 9,500 items of original Mad original art. His collections of comic book art were considered among the best in the country, and parts of his collections were put on national tours.

One notable part of Cohen's collection was begun in 1971, when he decided to collect cartoonists' self-caricatures. His interest was sparked upon seeing an exhibition catalog from a 1943 exhibit at San Francisco's de Young Museum titled Meet the Artist. Eventually he assembled more than 900 such self-caricatures. In 1998, Ohio State University's Cartoon Research Library, now known as the Billy Ireland Cartoon Library & Museum, published A Gallery of Rogues featuring approximately 100 cartoonists' self-caricatures from Cohen's collection. The Cartoon Research Library also mounted an exhibition of nude self-caricatures called The Comic Strip in 2000. It was composed of work from Cohen's collection, made available by his widow, Cohen having died during the time the exhibit was being planned.

As an agent representing cartoonists in the sale of their original comic strip art, Cohen's clientele included Charles M. Schulz, Lynn Johnston, Pat Brady, Greg Evans and Jerry Scott.

Cohen got to know Charles Schulz, creator of Peanuts, very well, and Schulz called Cohen his "cartoon connection" because of the many cartoonists he met through him. After Schulz' death, the cartoonist's wife started the Charles Schulz Museum, and Mark Cohen became a member of the board of directors. This truth of this statement is unlikely, since Mark Cohen died before Charles Schulz. Cohen's wife, Rose Marie McDaniel, later became director of the museum.

A portion of the Gasoline Alley Sunday strip (May 3, 2009) in which the artist paid tribute to collaborator Mark Cohen.

Cohen died at 57 at his home in Santa Rosa, California on December 19. Cancer was said to be the cause of death. His obituary in The New York Times states that Cohen's "comics collection, including about 3,000 books autographed by cartoonists -- many with original drawings -- and hundreds of other cartoon-related items, from Dick Tracy badges to Little Orphan Annie decoders, has been donated to Ohio State University, the repository of the National Cartoonists Society".

His friend, the cartoonist Wiley Miller, memorialized Cohen after his death by creating a superhero, Obviousman, in his syndicated cartoon strip Non Sequitur (comic strip) whose mission in life was to wean people away from the endless stream of information in modern society and get them to think about what is really happening. Just as Superman's "real name" was "Clark Kent," so was Obviousman's real name "Mark Cohen" and his occupation was "realtor."

Cartoonist Jim Scancarelli, in a 1997 interview, had credited Cohen as an unpaid collaborator who contributed a poem or story idea for a Gasoline Alley Sunday page about once a month. Scancarelli quietly paid tribute to Cohen with a 2009 Sunday page that featured a whimsical letter Cohen had written.
