= Emerald Knights =

1998 comic book story arc

- Cover of Green Lantern: Emerald Knights (1998), art by Darryl Banks.
- Publisher: DC Comics
- Publication date: June – October 1998
- Genre: Superhero
- Title(s): Green Lantern Vol. 3 #99-106; Green Arrow Vol. 2 #136
- Main character(s): Kyle Rayner; Hal Jordan

Creative team
- Writer(s): Ron Marz; Kevin Dooley
- Artist: Jeff Johnson
- Penciller: Darryl Banks
- Inker(s): Terry Austin; Bob Wiacek
- Letterer: Chris Eliopoulos
- Colorist: Rob Schwager
- Emerald Knights: ISBN 1-56389-475-0

"Emerald Knights" is a 6-part story that was originally published in Green Lantern vol. 3, issues #101-106. It is the story of Kyle Rayner teaming up with a pre-Parallax Hal Jordan.

This story was later collected by DC Comics in 1998 as the trade paperback Green Lantern: Emerald Knights (ISBN 1563894750), which included the last pages of Green Lantern vol. 3, issue #99 and issue #100, as well as Green Arrow vol. 2, #136.

== Background ==
Kyle had been battling his sometime nemesis Grayven when he fell into a time-warp and wound up in the 30th century, where he met the Legion of Super-Heroes. When asking to get back, Brainiac 5 put Kyle in a time-machine, intending to send Kyle back to his regular time. However, Kyle wound up being transported 10 years further back, to a time when Hal Jordan, many years before he became Parallax, was battling Sinestro (set during Green Lantern vol. 2, #9, implied to be the result of either a time platform malfunction or simply lacking historical records of this time period). Kyle helped Hal defeat Sinestro, and Kyle and Hal both wound up being transported back to Kyle's own time when Sinestro accidentally shoved Hal into Kyle as the Guardians were sending him home.

== Story ==
The main thrust of the story deals with a much younger Hal having to come to grips with the new reality he's in; specifically, the fact that he's (at that time) one of the most reviled villains, and that his friend Ollie Queen is dead. The other heroes are also unnerved at seeing their comrade back in prime condition and without any of the taint of the villainy his future self did. Kyle, for his part, mixes feelings of awe - at being teamed with 'the greatest Green Lantern' - and self-pity, as he now feels that he's being pushed out of the limelight.

Hal winds up having some solo adventures in Kyle's time, including fighting Kalibak, another of Darkseid's sons, when Kalibak tries to challenge Hal to prove his own skill, and Vince Hardy, an old acquaintance who Hal knew during his fighter-pilot days. Hardy had fought against Hal for control of a fighter jet they were test-piloting, which Hardy intended to sell to arms dealers, but Hal fought him off and crashed the fighter jet, which resulted in him being discharged due to the need for a scapegoat for the lost plane, since Hardy had escaped during the fight. Hardy now intends to send a plane to Seattle with a bomb supplied by the Eden Corps, a group of radical environmentalists who were responsible for Ollie's death. Teamed up with the current Green Arrow, Connor Hawke (although he is shocked to learn of Connor's connection to Oliver), Hal first loses his ring to Hardy, but eventually gets it back and saves the day with Connor's help, Hal preventing the plane from crashing into a mountain before capturing Hardy. The two later visit Ollie's grave, reflecting on how they each feel like they have lost him twice, given the limited time Connor spent with him and the fact that Hal comes from a time before his friendship with Oliver was as close as it would become later.

The last two issues deal with Kyle vs. Hal vs. Hal. Parallax (before the events of Zero Hour #0) was jumping through space-time when he notices a disturbance and investigated. Sensing his past self in a time when he shouldn't have been there, Parallax intends to send Hal back to his proper time. Kyle fought against Parallax, but is unable to stop Parallax and Hal from squaring off against each other. After Parallax and Hal fight each other to a standstill - even travelling all the way back to Coast City mere seconds before it was destroyed as Parallax attempts to win Hal over - Kyle intervenes yet again. Kyle explained that both men had to go back to their proper places in time - and what's more, they had to have no knowledge of these experiences. Hal refuses to go back if it meant that he would turn into Parallax, but Kyle explained that Hal had to go back - and Parallax had to go back, despite the fact that he would be defeated - because Parallax was needed to stop the Sun-Eater during The Final Night.

Acknowledging that he is proud to have him carry on the Green Lantern tradition, Hal hugged Kyle, whispering to him "You'll know what to do with it", before all three joined forces: Parallax would be responsible for returning everyone to their proper place in time, Hal's ring would wipe his and Parallax's minds of these events, and Kyle's ring acted to boost their power. With both Hal and Parallax back in their proper time - Hal having defeated Sinestro on his own and Parallax revealing himself as the main villain behind Zero Hour - Kyle reflects on recent events with Jen, his girlfriend... before revealing that Hal gave Kyle a copy of his Green Lantern ring.

== Aftermath ==
Kyle eventually copies Hal's power ring and gives it to Alan Scott's daughter, Jennifer-Lynn Hayden, allowing her to follow in her father's footsteps as the first female Green Lantern of Earth. In Green Lantern: The New Corps, during a weeks-long adventure in space, Rayner attempts to rebuild the Green Lantern Corps, recruiting Magaan Van'n Intraktus of the planet Van'n, Hammeroon (a bounty hunter from Ilskado System), Anya Savenlovich (a lieutenant colonel from Soviet Union Air Force who was in suspended animation after participating in a space mission in 1964), Garl Rathbone (a miner from the debris belt over the planet Daffith), and Sool (a judge, also from Daffith).

However, the group later discovered Van'n Intraktus was a traitor. Van'n had used his ring to enslave his home planet and planned to invade and conquer other worlds. The Green Lanterns eventually stopped the renegade after a battle, but at the cost of one of their own, Hammeroon. This led Kyle to the realization that he was not the right person to choose the future corps members and took all of the power rings back, until the time was right for the Corps' rebirth. After erecting a memorial for Hammeroon, Rayner returned to Earth. The former "New" Lanterns, no longer having their power rings, decided to continue their intergalactic adventures.

Jennifer eventually gave back the power ring Kyle had given her after she regained her Starheart powers and became the superheroine Jade once more. Even so, she is still considered to many as a member of the Corps. John Stewart would eventually take the ring and return as a Green Lantern. Kyle would later be possessed by the cosmic entity Ion, granting him the vast power he needed to create a new generation of Guardians. During Green Lantern: Rebirth, Hal Jordan was resurrected and returned to his role as the Green Lantern of Sector 2814, along with Guy Gardner. Jordan's murderous activity during Emerald Twilight was retconned as being influenced by a fear entity, Parallax. After defeating and imprisoning Parallax, Ganthet and the reborn Guardians succeeded in rebuilding the Green Lantern Corps.

== Title ==
The title is in keeping with some of the major storylines that have been told in dealing with Parallax, including Emerald Twilight (Hal going insane at losing Coast City and eventually becoming Parallax) and Emerald Fallout (Guy Gardner, in possession of a yellow power ring, fights with Hal, but winds up losing his power when his ring's charge fades - Guy needed to recharge from a Green Lantern power source).
