= Non Sequitur (comic strip) =

American comic strip

- Author: Wiley Miller
- Website: www.gocomics.com/nonsequitur
- Launch date: February 16, 1992; 34 years ago
- Syndicate: Universal Press Syndicate/Universal Uclick/Andrews McMeel Syndication
- Publisher(s): Random House; Andrews McMeel Publishing
- Genre(s): Comedy, political

Non Sequitur is a comic strip created by Wiley Miller (credited mononymously as Wiley) starting February 16, 1992 and syndicated by Andrews McMeel Syndication to over 700 newspapers. It is also published on gocomics.com and distributed via email.

Translated from Latin as "it does not follow", Non Sequitur is often political and satirical, though other times, purely comedic.

The strip has undergone many changes throughout its history. Originally, the comic was a single-panel gag cartoon, similar to Gary Larson's The Far Side. It grew more political (from a moderately liberal perspective) in tone during the 1990s, to the point where it often became a borderline editorial cartoon. Today, the comic has become more traditional, sometimes using a multi-panel format and recurring characters. The horizontal daily strip is sometimes used as a single panel. The Sunday strip is vertical.

Non Sequitur has been honored with four National Cartoonists Society Awards, including the Newspaper Panel Cartoon Award for 1995, 1996, and 1998, and the Newspaper Panels Award for 2002. It is the only comic strip to win in its first year of syndication and the only title to ever win both the best comic strip and best comic panel categories.

In 2026, Miller decided to ease his own load a bit by generating original strips for only 3 days a week (Sunday, Monday, Wednesday) and doing reruns the other 4 days (Tuesday, Thursday, Friday, Saturday).

== Characters in Whatchacallit, Maine ==
=== The Pyles ===
Originally Danae, Joe and "Offshore" Flo were separate characters in their segments but, their storylines were eventually fused and they were billed as being family. Joe and his daughters moved to his native New England to live near his mother following his divorce and withdrawal from major media outlets.

==== Joe ====
Joseph "Joe" Pyle is an unemployed former host of the talk radio program NoozTube, often frustrated by how mass media treats him, and used by the strip to comment on the media. As the cast of characters grew and merged, he became the often-bewildered father of Danae and Kate. His name may be a reference to the confrontational conservative talk show host, Joe Pyne, but is equally likely to be a tribute to beloved World War II correspondent Ernie Pyle; Joe thus represents the love-and-hate relationship many mainstream Americans have with the media. In his early appearances, Joe looked much like former President George H. W. Bush, whose family has a home in Maine.

His ex-wife and Danae and Kate's mother, Jennifer Pyle, is not seen and seldom referred to. She is said to have run off with a biker while the family was on a trip to New Hampshire.

==== Danae ====
Danae Pyle is a pre-adolescent girl with a pessimistic view of the world (but not of herself), often employed in the strip for satirical purposes. First appearing in the strip in 1998 with her sister Kate and parents (it can be assumed that this was set before their divorce), she is the most famous character of the strip and frequently its leading character.

==== Kate ====
Kate Pyle is the more optimistic sister of Danae. Often used as a foil to Danae in how their personalities and views of the world differ. The frequency of her appearances diminished with the creation of Lucy, who started acting as Danae's straight man.

==== Flo ====
Florence "Flo" Pyle is Joe's mother and owns Flo's Offshore Diner in Whatchacallit, Maine. Miller commented, "I created a series of characters that came from our visits to Maine. 'Offshore' Flo is patterned after the Maine Diner in Wells. I wanted to capture the essence of Maine people's genuineness—down-to-earth, good-natured people—and work in the accent... It's set in Whatchacallit, Maine." Flo often can be seen with a coffee maker's pot in her hand, though her diner also serves liquor, which is the source of Captain Eddie's tall tales.

==== Bob ====
Robert "Bob" Pyle is Joe's brother, often seen having a drink with him at a bar. He often tries to convince Joe to take a hold of get-rich-quick professions or become a cable news show host. According to the strip of January 15, 2003, he is an attorney, and in the strips of May 28–29, 2007, it is indicated he has a practice and has spent twenty years representing personal injury cases. He is single and avoids relationships with women.

According to Wiley Miller, Bob is patterned after his favorite character actor, Dabney Coleman, not just in appearance but in his sharp demeanor.

==== Uncle Reginald ====
Uncle Reginald Pyle is the ghost of an alcoholic elderly relative haunting Joe's house. Sometimes the reader is given a glimpse into an alternate world (perhaps the past as well) where Reginald is still alive. In this reality, he lives with his brother Montgomery "Monty" Pyle in a large, Victorian mansion with numerous servants including Smithers, the butler. Danae, Kate and Flo are well acquainted with Reginald, but Joe refuses to believe he exists in ghost form.

=== Other characters ===
==== Brenda ====
Brenda Santa Fe runs Brenda's Clam Hut and is a frequent visitor of Flo's Offshore Diner (possibly since her restaurant does not run into the night hours, like a diner does). She can frequently be seen in the latter as a customer while Captain Eddie tells his stories. She has a crush on Joe, but after Joe showed little interest, she ran off with another man. She sometimes wore a sweatshirt displaying the letters "KPT", a common abbreviation for Kennebunkport, Maine.

==== Victoria ====
Victoria Santa Fe is Brenda's older sister. She is much more brash than Brenda, and originally showed less interest in Joe. They began dating eventually, however, and Joe's family frequently urged him to propose to her. She works at Brenda's Clam Hut. On the last day of 2009 she appeared with a "pre-marriage agreement questionnaire" for Joe. Flo says she did not know they were dating, much less engaged, and Joe responds "Neither did I." Over the next three weeks Joe successfully answers all the questions and they become engaged. On January 18, 2010, Danae finds out they are engaged.

==== Jeffrey ====
Jeffrey is a fairly nerdy boy in Danae's class who has a crush on her. In Non Sequitur Sunday Color Treasury, the author describes how he was inspired by a reader to create the character.

==== Jack ====
Jack is Jeffrey's autistic 6-year-old younger brother, based on Miller's grandson, introduced March 29, 2020.

==== Lars ====
Lars is a Martian who appeared, beginning on May 2, 2009, in a series of strips that involved Jeffrey building a spaceship and going on an expedition to Mars. Lars acted as a helper in building the spaceship and a guide on Mars. Before Lars' appearance, Danae came along to see Jeffrey building the spaceship—consequently making her appear in the rest of the story.

==== Captain Eddie ====
Captain Eddie is a commercial fisherman from Maine (with the associated accent) who continually tells tall tales of his boating expeditions, usually involving giant lobsters or aliens, to anyone who will listen in Flo's coffee shop.

==== Fern ====
Fern is a classmate of Danae. She was first introduced in April 14, 2021. She seems Asian-American.

=== The Graevsytes ===
Introduced on September 8, 2002, the Graevsytes bear similarities to The Addams Family. The Graevsytes also appeared in Danae's Halloween series in October and November 2002.

==== Horace ====
Horace Graevsyte, the father, carries his head on a plate (he seems to be a ghost of a decapitated man).

==== Miranda ====
Miranda Graevsyte, the mother, floats around the house.

==== Boyle ====
Boyle Graevsyte, a teenage boy, bears some resemblance to Jason Voorhees from the Friday the 13th films.

==== Mimi ====
(Screaming) Mimi Graevsyte is the daughter and a baby.

=== Pets ===
==== Lucy ====
Lucy is a talking pygmy Clydesdale who, like Hobbes of Calvin and Hobbes, plays the silent observer most of the time. Lucy was introduced in the July 11, 2003 strip, in a storyline that had Danae and Kate going to a summer horse riding camp. At the end of the summer, Danae became good friends with Lucy and took her home. Unlike Hobbes, however, Lucy is a "real" horse who the kids talk to and interact with the same as any other character, nor is she invisible to adults.

==== Petey ====
Petey is a dog of humble origins who has found his way into Kate's ownership. He can also talk to Danae and Kate. He constantly lets Rölf get him in trouble.

==== Rölf ====
Rölf is Brenda's dog and Petey's friend. The size of his muzzle far exceeds his brains. He's also a symbol of the strip and can be seen in the cover of Non Sequitur's Beastly Things. Rölf (or an ancestor or relative from an earlier or alternate era) has also appeared in a short-lived series in Non Sequitur called B.E.

==== Paulie ====
Paulie is Captain Eddie's cat who is always with Eddie, accompanying him on his various fictional adventures, and usually sits on his shoulder, in place of the usual parrot accompanying a pirate.

== Other recurring characters ==
The majority of these characters only or mostly appear in Sunday strips.

=== Obviousman ===
Obviousman is a superhero who can't stand the overly obvious or hypocritical. His symbol is the word "Duh" with a slash through it (No Duh!). Usually appears only on Sundays.

He has appeared being interviewed by Joe on his radio show. Obviousman's secret identity is Mark Cohen, a California realtor and amateur magician, who has taken on a mission in life of freeing the people from the curse of mindless obedience to the dictates of the mass media, and to at least slow, if not reverse, the dumbing down of America. His nemesis is Professor Obfuscate.

In the book Non Sequitur's Sunday Color Treasury, Miller stated that he named Obviousman's true identity after a friend who had died of cancer in 1999. The real Mark Cohen was a realtor and an avid collector of comics and original comic book art. Miller explained, "This was my way of memorializing him. He was dearly loved throughout our profession as a great ambassador of comics as an art form."

An animated short, Obviousman: The Movie, can currently be found on the Non Sequitur website. Wiley Miller voices Obviousman.

=== Ordinary Basil ===
Ordinary Basil is a boy at the dawn of the Industrial Revolution who takes a journey to the cloud city of Helios. Story ran on Sundays from February 20 to July 24, 2005. Another story began on September 9, 2007 with a Sunday strip "The Return of Ordinary Basil" reviewing events thus far appearing on September 2 and concluded on January 6, 2008.

=== Ele ===
Ele (Extinction Level Event) is a cynical cat-like creature who lives in the time before man. Appearing in Sunday strips only, she has appeared in two major runs—one from 2000 up to July 2001, and one in early 2006.

=== Homer ===
Homer, called Honor in his female incarnations, is a departed soul who aside from dealing with living in the afterlife has to deal with real life whenever he returns to earth. He has been an ancient Roman (who barely escaped Pompeii), a medieval peasant, a cavewoman, and a female immigrant. Homer was developed into a spin-off strip called Homer the Reluctant Soul, which Wiley attempted to market online, and featured in a book by the same title.

=== Pierre of the North ===
Pierre of the North (a play off of Nanook of the North) is a French Canadian who hates "ze" cold and finds himself at odds with very clever (and very hungry) polar bears.

=== Lucifer ===
Lucifer (that is, Satan) often appears in the strip to delegate hellish punishments, such as watching reality shows.

=== St. Peter ===
St. Peter guards the gates of heaven and has interacted with numerous characters including Captain Eddie.

=== The bulldog ===
In numerous strips that deal with the home life of upper middle-aged couples, a pet bulldog with exaggerated fangs (similar to Rölf's, above) can be seen.

=== The Bears ===
A group of anthropomorphic bears (brown bears, unrelated to Pierre of the North's polar bears, above) often appear, usually seen trying to entice humans into their grasp, presumably for eating.

== Books ==
- Dead Lawyers and Other Pleasant Thoughts (1993) ISBN 0-6797-4441-X
- The Non Sequitur Survival Guide for the Nineties (1995) ISBN 0-8362-1785-3
- Non Sequitur’s Beastly Things (1999) ISBN 0-7407-0016-2
- The Legal Lampoon: a biased, unfair and completely accurate law review (2002) ISBN 0-7407-2673-0
- Why We'll Never Understand Each Other: A Non-Sequitur Look At Relationships (2003) ISBN 0-7407-3387-7
- Lucy and Danae: Something Silly This Way Comes (March 1, 2005) ISBN 0-7407-5099-2
- Non Sequitur's Sunday Color Treasury (2005) ISBN 0-7407-5448-3

== Controversies ==
=== New Straits Times controversy ===
Non Sequitur was published in the New Straits Times, a major newspaper in the Muslim-majority country of Malaysia, as part of its weekday line of comic strips. The comic, however, generated controversy in the country and its government following the paper's printing of the syndicated strip satirizing the protests over the controversial Jyllands-Posten Muhammad cartoons on February 20, 2006. The cartoon depicts a street-side cartoonist offering caricatures of Muhammad "while you wait" with a caption stating that the cartoonist has finally realized his goal of being the most feared man in the world.

The New Straits Times subsequently issued an apology. Wiley Miller commented on Malaysia's response to the strip, stating in a February 1, 2007 interview that it is "much ado about nothing."

=== Hidden message to Donald Trump controversy ===
The February 10, 2019 edition of Non Sequitur contained as an "easter egg" a hidden message to President Donald Trump. The strip parodied the art of Leonardo da Vinci with anthropomorphic bears, and featured several mostly-illegible scribbles, one of which contained the phrase "go fuck yourself Trump". Wiley confirmed the message and apologized, explaining that it was an oversight that he had meant to rectify. However, his Twitter post contradicted what he said in his apology. Multiple newspapers discontinued carrying the strip in response.
