= Luann (comic strip) =

Comic strip by Greg Evans

- The main cast of Luann, as depicted in a Christmas (December 25, 2001) comic strip (from left to right): Tiffany Farrell, Aaron Hill, Gunther Berger, Delta James, Bernice Halper, Luann DeGroot, Nancy DeGroot, Frank DeGroot, Brad DeGroot, Knute, Crystal, and Puddles
- Authors: Greg Evans (1985–present); Karen Evans (2012–present)
- Website: gocomics.com/luann
- Current status/schedule: Running
- Launch date: March 17, 1985; 41 years ago
- Syndicate(s): North America Syndicate/King Features Syndicate (1985–1996); United Feature Syndicate (1996–2011); Universal Uclick/Andrews McMeel Syndication (2011–present)
- Publishers: Berkley Books; Tor Books; Rutledge Hill Press; Andrews McMeel Publishing
- Genres: Humor; Adolescence

Luann is a syndicated newspaper comic strip written and drawn by Greg Evans. It was launched by North America Syndicate on March 17, 1985. The strip is currently syndicated by Andrews McMeel Syndication. In 2012, Greg Evans' daughter Karen Evans began co-authoring the strip.

Luann takes place in an unnamed suburban setting, and primarily focuses on young adult Luann DeGroot dealing with school, her love interests, family, and friends. Some storylines center on other characters, including her older brother Brad. The strip is particularly notable in that the characters age over time, albeit not in real time.

In 2003, Evans won the Reuben Award for Cartoonist of the Year for his work on Luann. On March 17, 2013, GoComics began republishing old strips under the title Luann Againn, starting with the first strip, dated March 17, 1985.

== Characters ==
=== Main ===
Luann C. DeGroot
The comic strip's protagonist, Luann often struggles with her self-image and is particularly self-conscious about her large feet. She can be shallow, self-centered, and immature. Luann graduated from Pitts Junior–Senior High School in 2014 and has dreams of becoming an entertainer after starring in West Side Story and being a beauty pageant runner-up. She is left-handed, which is a common trait among comic strip characters. Currently, Luann is attending a local junior college and taking introductory art and chemistry classes. She is working in early education alongside Tiffany during the summer. In a writing class, Luann shows an aptitude for writing comedy and humor, and as such, has started to show more wit in her conversations.
First appearance: March 17, 1985
Bernice Halper
Luann and Bernice have been close friends since third grade. Bernice is laid-back and observant, but tends to have a negative outlook on life. In 2007, she discovered she had an older brother, Sgt. Ben York, who was serving in Iraq. Bernice had initially planned to become a veterinarian, but ended up interning as a guidance counselor during her senior year. She started college at Moony University in 2014 and became friends with her roommate Dez. In 2015, she became a dorm R.A., but in 2020 her position was eliminated, forcing her to move in with the DeGroot family.
First appearance: March 18, 1985
Delta James
Luann's friend Delta started off as a slacker but became more ambitious as she got older. She joined many clubs and activities in school and volunteered. While Bernice is intellectually wise, Delta is politically intelligent and wants a career in politics. In 1998, Delta was diagnosed with Hodgkin lymphoma but went into remission the following year. In 2009, she almost couldn't go on a class trip to Washington, D.C., due to lack of funds, but was able to go with the help of donations raised by Luann, Bernice, Tiffany, and Elwood. During the trip, Delta met President Barack Obama in the White House. Delta is now attending Howard University in Washington and hasn't been mentioned much since 2014.
First appearance: April 1, 1985
Nancy and Frank DeGroot
Luann's parents. Nancy is portrayed as the heart of the family, while Frank provides for it, though he's usually portrayed as criminally cheap. Frank often seems clueless about what goes on, while Nancy is more aware. She constantly hounds Luann to clean her room, without success. Using their savings and money from T.J.'s insurance settlement, Frank and Nancy have purchased a rundown warehouse, and turned it into a restaurant and performance space.
Frank's first appearance: March 21, 1985 (voice), May 22, 1985 (drawn)
Nancy's first appearance: May 3, 1985 (voice), August 12, 1986 (drawn)
Brad DeGroot
Luann's older brother, Brad, used to have a snarky relationship with her. Brad spent his free time fixing his car. He worked at Weenie World but after 9/11, he became a firefighter. Brad had to get in shape for the job and now looks more fit. He and his friend T.J. moved into Brad's parents' rental home, which was damaged by T.J. Brad's firefighter storyline gets as much, if not more, attention than Luann's.
In June 2011 Brad was laid off but he was rehired in November after another firefighter left. On March 31, 2012, Brad proposed to Toni Daytona, with some persuasion from T.J., but they agreed to postpone the topic. On April 2, 2013, Toni proposed to Brad, and he accepted. Originally, they planned to have their wedding on September 11, but due to controversy, it was postponed to December 11, 2016. After the wedding, Toni moved into the house shared by T.J. and Brad. In September 2024, after taking care of Toni's niece Shannon for a month and finding they liked it, Brad and Toni decide to try and have a family of their own. On September 20, 2026, Brad and Toni announced Toni's pregnancy to their family.
Brad's first appearance: March 25, 1985 (voice), March 26, 1985 (drawn)
Brad got a firefighter's tattoo matching Toni's on August 27, 2008 (first seen August 28, 2008).

=== Love interests ===
Aaron Hill
Aaron is a boy who is desired by both Luann and Tiffany. He is sometimes vain, which makes him a good match for Tiffany. However, he also shows consideration for others' feelings. Luann finds him cute and lovable, but he has been mixed up in the past, having been in love with an older girl named Diane. He currently lives in Hawaii. Luann won a free trip to Hawaii in August 2005 and visited Aaron, but discovered he had a new girlfriend named Lian. Aaron later contacted Luann through MySpace in October 2006, sharing his experiences in Hawaii and revealing that he had broken up with Lian. This reignited Luann's feelings for Aaron. Although there was speculation about his return, Aaron has not been seen since Luann's trip to Hawaii.
First mentioned: March 23, 1985
First appearance March 24, 1985
Last appearance: August 15, 2005, with a flashback cameo on April 1, 2020
Gunther Berger
Gunther, a smart student at Pitts High School, lacks fashion sense and gentlemanly qualities. He has feelings for Luann but is jealous of her crushes on other guys. Although Luann is not interested in him, she becomes jealous when Gunther shows interest in other girls. Gunther also has a romantic interest in Bernice, with whom he has more in common. He wears contact lenses despite being allergic to them. Gunther volunteers at the local library and is skilled at sewing. He lives with his mother and has insecurities about his father leaving the family. Luann helps Gunther when his mother breaks her leg. Gunther and Rosa Aragones have mutual feelings for each other, but Gunther is nervous around her. Luann supports Gunther and gives him advice on winning Rosa's heart. Gunther goes to Peru with Rosa but eventually returns home to attend college. He becomes study buddies with Tiffany, which complicates their relationship. Gunther's bully from high school, Leslie Knox, becomes an acquaintance when Leslie's uncle starts dating Gunther's mother. Gunther is upset when Leslie's uncle proposes to his mother. In college, Gunther has a new girlfriend in Bets, a cosplay enthusiast & influencer. Though their personalities clash at times (Bets being more adventurous while Gunther is more cautious), the two try to make their relationship work, such as buying a van to tour the country with. On numerous occasions through the years, Gunther and Luann have had interactions that seemed to imply they share a mutual attraction, yet both insist that they're not interested in each other romantically, but are rather just dear, mutual friends.
First mentioned: March 23, 1985
First appearance: November 29, 1987
Quill
A Pitts High School senior from Australia, Quill moved to the US with his family. His arrival caused tension between Luann and Tiffany, as Tiffany was attracted to Quill but he showed more interest in Luann due to their shared interests and her intelligence. They shared their first kiss at a New Year's Eve Party in 2011. Luann and Quill admitted their attraction but decided not to pursue a relationship because Quill would have to return to Australia. However, they couldn't resist and kissed again in Luann's room, but Quill received a call from his father informing him that they were moving back to Australia. They maintained a long-distance relationship until 2014 when Quill returned to the US and graduated with Luann's class. He became roommates with Gunther and prioritized his acting career over Luann, causing her to break up with him in 2016. After a follow-up appearance a few months later, confirming he had moved on with his life, he disappeared from the strip entirely. Like Luann, Quill is left-handed.
First appearance: June 22, 2009
Last appearance: September 28, 2016, with a flashback cameo on April 1, 2020
Toni Louise Daytona
Brad's wife and fellow firefighter, Toni, joined him in all of the pre-fire academy courses. However, when Brad failed the physical exam, Toni continued on her own. Toni's boyfriend, Dirk, became jealous and abusive towards her and physically violent towards Brad. Toni eventually ended the relationship with Dirk. After Dirk was released from jail, Toni and Brad started socializing again, but their friendship was strained when Brad had Dirk arrested for violating a restraining order. They stopped speaking for months but eventually reconnected when Brad moved into his rental home. Their relationship progressed slowly, including dates, and they shared their first kiss on April 2, 2008. In a mid-2009 incident, Toni fell from a ladder while fighting a fire and Brad caught her, injuring himself in the process. Toni offered to take care of Brad during his recovery and confessed her love for him. On a 2010 holiday strip, Toni and Brad went shopping. Toni had Brad hold her purse while she bought lingerie, showing their relationship was progressing. In June 2010, Toni revealed that her parents died in a car crash when she was a child, and she and her brother were raised by their aunt and uncle. Toni, her brother Jonah, and his daughter Shannon moved to Pitts about 4 years ago. On March 31, 2012, Brad proposed to Toni. On April 2, 2013, Toni proposed to Brad, which seemed to be a serious proposal unlike Brad's previous one. Brad accepted the next day. Their wedding was on December 11, 2016. Toni also has a strong knowledge of automobiles and uses this to help Gunter and Bets buy a used van for cross-country traveling, buying it at $3,000 lower than what the seller was originally asking for. In the spring and summer of 2024, Brad and Toni have serious discussions about having children, and while they initially balk at the prospect, due to the hectic schedules of their jobs, this changes when they have to watch Shannon for a short time while Jonah's away, and after a rocky start, the two realize they could be able to raise a child together, and after Shannon leaves, Brad and Toni decide to start trying to have a family. On September 20, 2026, Brad and Toni announced Toni's pregnancy to their family.
She has a firefighter tattoo on her right shoulder (FD on crossed axes), first seen August 26, 2008, still healing after she got it.
First appearance: January 18, 2002
Diane
Brad's first love interest was a source of confusion for him. He constantly tried to impress her but failed. A recurring joke was that she would startle him while he worked on his car, causing him to hit his head. She briefly dated Aaron Hill but they realized they were too different. Brad and Luann were outraged when they saw Diane kiss Aaron. Before leaving town, Diane realized she and Brad had little in common, particularly his love for cars.
First mentioned: July 10, 1989
First appearance: July 30, 1989
Last appearance: February 13, 1999, although she appeared in the background at Brad and Toni's wedding: December 11, 2016
Miguel Vargas
Miguel, a foreign exchange student from Spain, quickly caught the attention of Delta when he saved her from a thief. As Miguel started his first day at school, he found himself being pursued by Luann, Delta, and Tiffany. Although he liked all three girls, he was most drawn to Luann because of her down-to-earth personality. However, when Delta fell ill with cancer, Miguel showed unwavering support, which made Luann jealous. Luann found Miguel attractive but felt he was too aggressive, leading to an on-and-off romantic tension between them. On November 29, 1999, Miguel took Luann on a date to a secluded parking spot, but their plans were interrupted when Luann received a phone call pretending to be a family emergency. Miguel also saved Tiffany's life by performing CPR when she almost drowned in the pool. Tiffany took advantage of his kindness by using him to steal Gunther's test paper. When Tiffany got caught, she convinced Miguel to take the blame, claiming he did it willingly for her. Instead of betraying Tiffany, Miguel chose to accept the blame and decided to return to Spain.
First appearance: August 25, 1998
Last appearance: March 14, 2001, with a flashback cameo on April 1, 2020
Stuart
Lifeguard at Pitts Public Pool. Saved Luann and Tiffany from drowning. Luann developed a crush on Stuart but was heartbroken when he mentioned his wife.
First appearance: July 4, 2000
Last appearance: June 16, 2001, with a flashback cameo on April 1, 2020
Zane
Zane, former boyfriend of Bernice and owner of Monroe, became paralyzed in a car accident that killed his parents. It took him a year to fully recover. He was saved by Brad in a fire at Borderline Books. Bernice was deeply in love with him and jealous of rivals like Crystal and Ann Eiffel. Zane realized he needed to address past issues, including his relationship with his sister. Bernice proposed marriage, but Zane asked her to wait. Crystal was attracted to Zane, but he only saw her as a friend. Bernice dumped Zane when he failed to notice her new glasses, feeling he was disinterested.
First appearance: June 27, 2001
Last appearance: August 27, 2004
Elwood Druit
The "Elvis Jr." of Pitts High School, Elwood is a wealthy video game creator known for his "Eyez of Zeye" franchise. He is arrogant and cancelled a date with Luann for "someone better". He briefly dated Tiffany, possibly due to his wealth. In 2009, he offered to pay for Delta's trip in exchange for a date with Luann. They went to a fancy restaurant he claimed to own. Elwood has made advances towards Luann and donated money to the library, causing jealousy from Gunther. Bernice suspects him of being a fraud as she found no evidence of his wealth online. Elwood proposed to Luann with a fake ring, claiming it was worth $15,000. He never appeared again.
First appearance: March 25, 2005
Last appearance: October 10, 2009
Ben York
Bernice's older brother, an army sergeant on leave from the Middle East, was given up for adoption by their parents. He returned briefly after finding them online. The DeGroot and Halper siblings went bowling together. Brad initially felt jealous but felt better after learning Ben tried to become a firefighter. Luann developed a crush on Ben, exchanging emails with him. Bernice demanded their contact cease. Ben broke his leg in Iraq and returned home. Luann made a Valentine's Day dinner for him, unaware he would be out of town. Ben appeared again in 2020 after leaving the service, where it is revealed he is now married with children.
First appearance: January 22, 2007
Claudia
Aaron Hill's Texan girlfriend is deaf but learned lip reading to communicate. Luann initially thought Claudia was made up until Aaron introduced her. Despite remaining friends with Luann, Claudia grew tired of Aaron's flirting with Tiffany and ended their year-long relationship.
First appearance: March 24, 2001
Last appearance: December 11, 2001

=== Other friends, relatives and neighbors ===
Knute
The upbeat, skateboarding, class clown and Gunther's best friend. Knute and Gunther often team up to create a working magic show, but often with unsuccessful results. He and Crystal have shared feelings for each other but never showed much more than that, finding they are the exact opposite of each other in every way. However, in early February 2011, they did go on a date to a Laurel and Hardy film festival.
First appearance: September 15, 1986
Last appearance: February 25, 2018
T.J. (also called TJ)
Brad's best friend, who comes up with outrageous schemes, and when they fail, manages to leave Brad holding the bag. He is, however, a very gifted gourmet chef, a skilled builder, and ultimately a good person in the long run. T.J. has disclosed that his mother is deceased, and that his father had been in prison for three years, but had set up a bank account for T.J. before moving to Argentina. Although he and Brad moved back into the rental home after it was repaired, he has formed bonds with the DeGroot family.
First mentioned: September 20, 1993
First appearance: September 27, 1993
Rosa Aragones
A relatively new girl at Pitts High School when she was first shown. She was born in Washington, D.C., and raised in Italy, France, and Mexico, and can speak English as well as French, Italian, and Spanish, leading Luann to wonder why she's in school. Later that year, she is assisted with her books by Gunther, sparking jealousy in Luann until she learns that Rosa hurt her arm carrying her sister into her wheelchair. She appears again in the Pageant storyline of March/April 2011. Later, she and Gunther grow closer, and their developing relationship is encouraged by Luann as she tries to decide how to proceed in her relationship with Quill. While Rosa is open about her attraction to him, Gunther tends to be awkward and bumbling around her, wanting to please her. They eventually began dating, and upon graduating from high school, they travel to Peru to assist at her uncle's clinic. However, Gunther becomes disillusioned with Peru, and returns to the U.S. with the encouragement of Rosa, who remains.
First appearance: September 5, 2006
Last appearance: January 12, 2015
Mrs. Horner
An elderly woman whom Luann visits from time to time and who frequently gives her candid advice. In March 2006 she moved out of her old home and into a new retirement center, but needed the help of Luann, who asked Bernice, Brad, and Toni to help her move out. Dirk followed Toni to the home, and to impress and be near Toni, helped the moving job finish faster; however, when he picked up Mrs. Horner's clock, an envelope full of money fell out, which Dirk pocketed, intending to steal it. He was caught by Brad, he claimed it to be his, but when Brad swiped it at the perfect time to return to Mrs. Horner, Dirk turned his story around and claimed to have found the envelope in the clock and intended to return it to her. He would have been kicked out if Mrs. Horner had not believed his lie. She later sold her old home to Nancy and Frank, who began renting to Brad. She has made occasional appearances in the strip since then.
First appearance: July 16, 2001
Eddie Munter
The new manager of Borderline Books, who replaced Ann Eiffel after she was unwillingly transferred. While Munter is normally very humorous and goodhearted, often ending his comments or jokes with "Kidding!", he knows when to be tough and decisive with his employees, earning the respect of Bernice and Zane shortly after he took over.
First appearance: July 9, 2002
Last appearance: August 27, 2004
Shannon Daytona (Lewis?)
Toni's bratty, blunt and disrespectful six-year-old niece. Her mother left soon after her birth, leaving her with her father, Jonah Daytona. Possibly due to her father ignoring his responsibilities and leaving her with Toni a great deal of the time, Shannon gets what she wants through demanding, whining or throwing temper tantrums. Toni's continuous babysitting has unfortunately reduced the amount of time Brad and Toni have to see each other. Shannon seems to have a strong liking for Brad, whom she's renamed "Bwad", although the feeling is not exactly mutual. Shannon first appeared in 1996, when Luann was asked to sit for the 3-year old in addition to her cousin, Lindy Lewis, but quit due to Shannon's bad behavior. She later reappeared in the strip as Toni's 5-year old cousin in 2008, but in June 2010 it was established that she was actually Toni's niece. While Greg Evans doesn't explicitly state that the 1996 Shannon and the 2008 Shannon are one and the same character, he notes in his blog that while Shannon Daytona is not Shannon Lewis, Luann did indeed babysit her, and that they both recognized each other. As the earlier Shannon's last name was never disclosed, and since Jonah Daytona was never married to Shannon's mother, this may imply that she was never Shannon Lewis in the first place. Toni once referred to Shannon as "Mini Eiffel" due to her similar appearance and personality.
First appearance: January 8, 1996
Jonah Daytona
Toni's brother and Shannon's father. He first appeared alongside Toni at a car show where Brad had initially mistaken him for Toni's boyfriend. Seen as flaky and irresponsible by the rest of the characters, his desired acting career causes him to constantly leave Shannon with his sister so he can rush off to auditions. This tends to get in the way of both her job and her relationship with her boyfriend, Brad, but lately they have become a bit more willing to take care of Shannon (partly due to their low opinion of Jonah's parenting). He had a role in the play Les Miserables, and hoped this would lead to his becoming rich and famous, but it did not, and he continues to seek work. Judging from the collective opinion of Brad, Toni, Quill, and Luann, his acting skill left much to be desired. In the August 16 to 18, 2016, strips, Toni was able to confront Jonah of being irresponsible of taking care of Shannon, but he managed to twist things around and blame Toni, causing her to look after Shannon once more reluctantly. In the summer of 2024, Jonah manages to land a spot in a series of shampoo commercials, making Toni and Brad look after Shannon again while he's away to film them. When he returns, Jonah announces that he also found voice-acting work that allows him to work remotely from home and take Shannon under his care once again.
First appearance: June 12, 2003
Oxford
Oxford, called Ox for short, is a big student who first appeared when Leslie was about to hurt Gunther. He breaks up the scuffle by telling Leslie that if he beat up Gunther, he would do the same to Leslie, causing him to leave. Gunther later thanks him for standing up for his safety; it is revealed that Ox doesn't like bullying or bullies in general and that some people mistake him for one (due to his height and brawny physique). Ox is very kind and likes to help others in need. It is hinted that Ox has rich parents, as they gave him a platinum credit card to pay for his lunches (which tend to be large). He becomes friends with Gunther and eventually T.J. in the May 9, 2012, strip, when he starts eating at Weenie World. In the May 17, 2012, strip, during which Ann Eiffel plans to sue Toni and her niece, Shannon (the latter having bit her finger in an April 2012 strip), Ox returns and upon learning of the event and Ann's cruel way of forcing him to sign a paper to file lawsuit, he refuses and sees Ann as another bully. In the May 22, 2012, strip, Ox takes her paper to show it to his uncle: a lawyer. Ox later agrees not to tell on her so long as she gives up trying to sue Toni; in the final strip of the week, Ann offers Ox a job, impressed by his integrity, but Ox refuses, as he is convinced that Ann simply isn't nice. Ox now works as a server at the DeGroots' restaurant. Ox is also highly intelligent, as when Gunther and Luann show up for a costume party with a "doll theme", and Tiffany thinks their costumes don't fit, Ox figures out that Gunther is dressed as a book written by Roald Dahl while Luann is dressed as Dolly Parton, making the costumes fit phonetically.
First appearance: March 2, 2012
Desdemona
Desdemona, always referred to as Dez, is Bernice's roommate at Moony Uni. Dez was unseen for the entirety of Bernice's first semester, always coming and going when Bernice was gone or asleep. Her friends, however, were often imposing on Bernice, dropping stuff off or throwing impromptu parties. She finally introduces herself to Bernice on February 23, 2015. Dez is very spiritual and worldly and decorates the dorm room with souvenirs from her travels.
First mentioned: August 18, 2014
First appearance: February 23, 2015
Prudence
Prudence (aka Pru) is a friend of Quill's. She is from New York, and currently staying with the Degroots. During his time in New York as an intern in a theater program, Quill was partnered with a fellow intern, Prudence. Quill had told the others that Prudence was coming from New York to direct a Holiday Show that she wrote, which they could use for opening night of The Fuse. Initially, Luann was jealous of Quill's and Pru's relationship, despite Quill insisting that they were friends, and Bernice was wary of her, thinking that Pru was interested in stealing Quill from Luann. However, when Bernice and Prudence were comforting Luann, it was revealed that Prudence is, as she puts it, "a lesbian thespian!" Prudence is very energetic and friendly towards everyone. Prudence has some things in common with Luann, as they both love the arts, and they both practiced what they were going to say before meeting each other. Pru worked at the DeGroots' event space/restaurant and living in Brad's old bedroom. In March 2020 she announced she was moving back to New York City and marrying a pilot.
First mentioned: July 27, 2015
First appearance: November 19, 2015
Last appearance: April 6, 2020
Jack and Nil
Two male students who attended the same college art class with Luann. Jack is seen as an upbeat, yet not very bright person, whereas Nil shows no emotion and makes sardonic remarks about everything. While the professor and Luann initially referred to them as "Jock" and "Goth", their real names remained unknown until the November 3, 2016, strip. Jack likes dogs and can be seen taking his pet dog, Max, to the dog park, where Luann spends time with Puddles. Bernice became infatuated with Jack after meeting him until she went on to have a relationship with Nil; this continued until she felt that she was uncontrollable with her intimacy for the latter. They subsequently remain as friends and she serves as a "muse" for his artwork. It was implied afterward that Nil might be bisexual, or rather asexual, after he casually mentioned to Bernice about a random person named Fred who had been asking him out for months.
First appearance: January 26, 2015
Tara Starr
Kicked out of Moony Uni for stealing a dorm TV and breaking into a vending machine on Bernice's floor, Tara showed up the next fall as Luann's chemistry lab partner at the junior college. She's uninhibited, free-wheeling, and a little wild, but she recognizes the mistakes she made at Moony and intends to buckle down at the Junior College. However, she soon begins rebelling again when she signs up for a class where Luann is the TA, thinking Luann will give her special treatment. She later decides to move to Utah in order to escape her criminal cousin, but ultimately changed her mind once the cousin was arrested. She ended up getting Luann into trouble at work by bringing a bow and arrow into an elementary school classroom (Luann was doing an after-school program and allowed Tara to meet her students without clearing it with the school administration). In late February 2023, it was revealed that she and Piro are cousins and that they have family issues.
First mentioned (as a "suspect"): April 25, 2017
First mentioned by name: August 26, 2017
First appearance: August 28, 2017
Bets
A cosplay enthusiast and current girlfriend of Gunther, and is also Tiffany's college roommate. While she is eager and creative, she is also very self-centered and focused on her social media following. This leaves her oblivious to how her actions can sometimes affect other people, such as pressuring Gunther into featuring on her social media despite his reluctance, and steamrolling over Tiffany's fancy dinner party business with her own ideas. After she and Gunter buy a van for a cross-country trip, when they return, Bets leaves again on her own to travel more and posting about it on social media. When she returns, she comes back to seeing Gunther and Luann attending a costume party together, leaving everyone, both at the party and on social media, to believe that Gunther and Luann are now a couple. Initially breaking up with him, Gunther convinces Bets that he wants to be with her, and the two agree to work their differences out. As a result, Bets decides to delete her social media profiles to show how much she's changed.
First mentioned: February 2, 2019
First appearance: April 1, 2019

=== Antagonists ===
Tiffany Farrell
Tiffany is Luann's nemesis, a physically attractive, but shallow and arrogant cheerleader in school who constantly insults and belittles Luann. Her best friend is Crystal. It is hinted that Luann and Tiffany might have been friends in elementary school, but their relationship changed once they got to junior high. Luann and Tiffany often battle for the attentions of various boys, with Luann almost always coming out on top. In March 2003, Luann and Tiffany form a brief friendship after winning a volleyball game as a team, but it falls apart due to their ongoing rivalry over Aaron. Tiffany uses her cell phone camera to take a picture of Luann changing in the girls locker room, initially, trying to blackmail Luann. When Luann fails to cooperate, Tiffany posts the photo on the internet, embarrassing Luann. With Gunther's help, Luann causes Tiffany to be suspended. In January 2008, her title of Miss Chamber of Commerce is revoked due to her role in T.J.'s catering scheme to sell meals in fire stations. In January 2009, she helps Luann fund Delta's accompanying them to Washington, D.C.; Tiffany's help is short-lived, however. In 2011, she stages a school beauty pageant, the proceeds of which help pay for new bathroom mirrors. Despite liking attractive boys, Tiffany tells Crystal that she never had an actual boyfriend. However, in 2015, she develops a physical attraction to Gunther, her "study buddy." By 2017, Tiffany is struggling with weight gain, brought on by depression. Meanwhile, Tiffany and Luann experience something of a truce late in the year, and have since been less hostile to each other. While in college, Tiffany has started to show some signs of maturity, but still occasionally is completely self-absorbed. Tiffany currently works as a waitress in the DeGroots' restaurant, and is roommates with Bets.
First mentioned: March 23, 1985
First appearance: November 10, 1985
Crystal
Tiffany's only friend though not exactly an antagonist. Although Crystal wears abundant cosmetics, her goth clothing does not follow the trendy fashions Tiffany wears. However, there are hints of lingering affection between them. She has a handicapped brother named Josh, who looked up to Zane as a mentor. She and Bernice formed a rivalry for Zane's affection, similar to the rivalry between Luann and Tiffany. When Zane began mentoring her brother Josh, she developed a crush on him. During this time, she attempted to occupy as much of Zane's free time as possible leaving him none to spend with Bernice, which added to Bernice's insecurity at the time. In an August 16, 2003, strip she is shown with a star tattoo on her back. She hangs out with Knute a lot, neither one caring what the world thinks of them together or individually, though any romance between them remains subtextual at best.
First appearance: July 12, 2000
Last appearance: October 1, 2017, with a flashback cameo on December 31, 2017
Dirk
Toni's jealous former boyfriend and Brad's main rival for Toni Daytona's affections. He has been emotionally abusive toward Toni and physically violent to Brad, and displays severe anger problems. A common boast is that he plans to, or will be, attending the police academy, but it has been pointed out that he has a felony conviction which would automatically disqualify him. While he did not originally view Brad as a threat, when Brad offered to give Toni a ride home after class, Dirk chased after them, causing a car crash in which he was injured. Ironically, Brad resuscitated him in time. Since then, Dirk became more possessive of Toni, foreshadowing their eventual break-up. After striking Brad at his fire academy graduation ceremony, he was arrested, and a restraining order was issued ordering him to stay away from Brad. Following his release from jail, he took a mandatory anger management course, but he has continuously violated the restraining order (since October 2005). Unwilling to accept Toni dumping him, he continuously stalked her and tried to impress her with shallow gimmicks to try to win her back. In the beginning of May 2006, he was sent back to jail because Brad called the police on him for violating his restraining order.
Dirk returned to the strip as a garbage collector on September 6, 2010 but claims to be working that job only until he starts at the police academy. Shortly after doing so, when Nancy fell off a ladder while doing housework, he helped pick her up. Later in the strip's run, his transformation was proven when he coincidentally ran into Toni at the local grocery store — with his new wife and child. He explains that his anger-management courses did wonders for him, and he met his now-wife through them, and now lives an honest life with his new family.
First appearance: June 19, 2003
Last appearance: March 13, 2013
Derek
Bernice's first love interest. Derek initially hit on Bernice and asked her to let him store his gym clothes in her locker. Unaware that Derek's interest in her was only to find a safe place to hide his stash of marijuana in her locker, Bernice fell for him instantly. However, when Bernice discovered drugs in Derek's bag while going through her locker, she was about to turn him in until he "seduced" her with a kiss. While giving Bernice a ride home, Derek almost crashed, as he was under the influence. Bernice got out of the car, but not before dumping his stash of drugs into the street. He appeared again for a short time in May 1989 when he declared how much he loved Delta, and he loved Bernice as a 'friend'. Delta was not impressed. Derek has not appeared since.
First appearance: September 28, 1987
Last appearance: May 19, 1989
Ann Eiffel
Former manager of Borderline Books and former manager of Weenie World. On numerous occasions her name shown to be a pun on the phrase, "an eyeful".
Eiffel initially hired Bernice as an employee at Borderline. When Bernice began working with Zane, one of the store's supervisors, Eiffel became very jealous of their relationship and even threatened to fire them if they continued seeing each other. Bernice suspected Eiffel wanted to seduce Zane, but she was actually interested in Bernice instead. Eiffel often interrupted Bernice's tasks by making Bernice bring her lattes; this was either to keep her away from Zane or to gratify herself by making Bernice run her personal errands, a maneuver she repeated in later appearances. When she fired Zane, Bernice developed a very rebellious attitude toward her, which led to Eiffel increasing her harassing efforts to intimidate her, until Borderline CEO Jim Hernandez, who knew Zane very well, arranged to transfer Eiffel to the new bookstore in Tokyo, Japan. On July 12, 2011, she resurfaced as the manager of the local Weenie World restaurant, where Brad applied for work after being laid off by the fire department. In 2012, T.J. began working at Weenie World to take Ann Eiffel down. She fired him on January 5, 2013, after he made a recording of Eiffel saying she cons people. He made a second recording in the process of being fired that had Eiffel saying that she took credit for all his sales. He saved both recordings despite Eiffel attempting to delete them. Before leaving, Eiffel kissed T.J., who was not impressed. She returned in August 2017 and was revealed as Leslie Knox's mother. Ann also began dating Tiffany's father Tom in January 2018. They were engaged until it was revealed in July 2020 that Ann had tricked Tiffany's father into thinking she was pregnant, at which point Tom broke up with Ann.
First appearance: January 24, 2002
Last appearance: July 18, 2020
Leslie Knox
The sleazy and arrogant bully of Pitts High School, and the nephew of Mr. Gray. Leslie Knox (who always demands to be known as "Les") is a potential stalker of Rosa Aragones. Gunther, who witnessed him harassing Rosa, defended her by swinging his backpack around and twice knocked Les down, supposedly by accident. Les attempted to retaliate but Miss Phelps broke up the confrontation. Les then made an offer to Rosa: if she let him kiss her, he would refrain from taking revenge on Gunther. He has also been seen hitting on Tiffany and extorting money from younger students in the hallways. He reappeared in 2016 when his uncle Mr. Gray sought to get him a job at The Fuse. Since starting he has created a charade of charities to earn extra money on the side. Following the wedding of Brad and Toni, he talked The Fuse employees into doing a gift exchange, as a means of making his move on fellow employee, Prudence, unaware that she is actually a lesbian. When he does learn this fact however, in a surprising show of depth, he accepts it without much fuss, and appears to remain friends with her.
While it has not actually been confirmed, comments by high school counselor Mrs. Phelps about him being the "lowest achiever" and his absence from the 2014 high school graduation imply that he failed to graduate from high school, an indication of his uncle's insistence on remaining employed with the Fuse. Also, his uncle has implied he owes court fines/fees. It has been revealed that his mother is Ann Eiffel, and that they have had a falling out in the past. On October 14, 2017, it was revealed that Leslie's court fines/fees stem from his running up his mother's $5,000 credit card and Ann successfully suing for restitution.
First appearance: January 28, 2012
Stefani Bird
Commonly referred to as Stef, she is Tiffany's roommate at Moony University after having to downsize to a shared dorm, though she ends up moving along with Tiffany to a 4-person dorm with Bets and Dez. She is infamous for demanding her roommates bend over backwards to accommodate her wishes, using their beauty products without asking, and even once demanded one of them give her $600 to attend a cheerleading competition. Is dating football player Kip, whom Tiffany is obsessed with seducing away from her. She serves as the strip's replacement "evil cheerleader" archetype since Tiffany's character development, as everyone in the strip except Kip despises her (though they continue living with her each semester.) She is rarely seen in an outfit other than her cheerleading uniform.
First appearance: February 1, 2020

=== School and faculty ===
Mr. Fogarty
The school history teacher. He secretly loves Miss Phelps. Mr. Fogarty's character was created before Luann. His character starred in Fogarty, which was distributed free of charge to several high school newspapers in the late 1970s and early 1980s. Mr. Fogarty announced that he would retire from teaching at the end of the school year in the May 4, 2014, strip.
First mentioned: May 8, 1985
First appearance: September 11, 1985
Last appearance: May 24, 2014
Miss Margo Phelps
The school's incompetent guidance counselor. She had never been married during her tenure at the school, and often compared Luann to her cat while she was having relationship problems. She secretly loves Mr. Fogarty, and marries him sometime after the cast graduates from high school, later going into private practice. In February 2026 she appeared as a career coach who writes romance novels.
First appearance: April 8, 1985
Miss Allison
The school P.E. teacher. She, like all other fitness teachers, is a strict disciplinarian. Out of all the teachers Luann knows well at Pitts High School, Miss Allison seems to be the only one Luann looks up to as a mentor figure.
First appearance: April 30, 1986 (voice), May 19, 1992 (drawn)
Principal Hightower
The principal of Pitts High School. Usually his face is never seen, only his hands when they are placed on his desk. His face may have been seen in a flashback as Luann's elementary school principal in the October 9, 2002 and October 10, 2002, comics, but it is unknown whether this is the same Principal Hightower, or perhaps a relative or someone with the same last name.

=== Emergency medical services ===
Captain Newman
The disciplined, strict disciplinarian and straightforward fire captain of Fire Station No. 3, and Brad's superior officer. Brad first met him when he began the physical exam for the fire academy. He has assigned Brad and Toni to take Reddy to local schools on more than one occasion, and has assigned Brad to his tasks of his rank as a firefighter. After a firefighters' ball was announced, the captain was speaking to someone on the phone and saying he planned to take Toni with him. However, he was referring to taking his friend, Tony Gale; which is somewhat ambiguous, as (in the next strip) Brad remarks, "So the captain's..." – "not asking me," Toni interrupts. Whether Tony is a male or female is left to the reader's imagination, apparently.
In a 2011 storyline, due to budget cuts, the captain had to let a firefighter go, and because Brad was the most recently hired, regretfully had to let him go, until the departure of another firefighter resulted in an opening.
First appearance: June 7, 2004
EMT Supervisor
Brad's supervisor during his six months of EMT service before taking his paramedics class. As gracious as he was about Brad fearlessly saving Zane from dying in the fires of the Borderline Bookstore, he had to file a reprimand on Brad's record for violating safety rules, acting outside his training scope, and not wearing proper safety gear. His name is not given.
First appearance: August 3, 2002

=== Animals ===
Puddles
Luann's dog, so named for his tendency to wee in the wrong spots.
First appearance: December 26, 1985
Monroe
Zane's dog and special canine companion. He is a Golden Retriever and has grown to be a very faithful companion for Zane.
Reddy
The fire station mascot. He is a small, 3-foot fire truck, with a remote controller and a built in speaker connected to a microphone and head set, to appear as though he is speaking with his partner. Brad and Toni have brought him to local elementary schools on more than one occasion to demonstrate the importance of fire safety. Brad provides the voice for Reddy and uses Reddy as a means to flirt with Toni. Brad has also used Reddy as a means to speak more openly with Toni. When Brad turned in Dirk and was arguing with Toni about it, he expressed his frustration through Reddy leading to an embarrassing encounter during a school presentation. Afterward, he told the captain he no longer wants to perform as Reddy to create space between him and Toni.
First appearance: June 6, 2005
Cuddles
Luann's cat, an addition to the strip (the storyline has Frank DeGroot being allergic to cats; thus, Luann must keep the two separated). Luann gave Cuddles to Mrs. Horner, to spare her father from his allergies. While Puddles showed some hatred towards Cuddles mainly over territory and attention from Luann matters, he also showed some love as they have cuddled and slept together a few times. Cuddles' original name was Sassy, until Mrs. Horner found a better name as Cuddles.
First appearance: November 1, 2005
Punk
Les Knox's cat.

=== Celebrity cameos ===
Clay Aiken, Jay Leno and Ben Affleck, Hugh Hefner, Barack Obama, Luke Perry, Bill Gates and Ricky Martin.

=== Aging ===
While most comic strips use a floating timeline and keep characters the same age for prolonged periods of time, the characters in Luann have aged over time, albeit not in real time.

From 1985 to 1999, Luann was vaguely in the eighth grade. According to Evans' blog, Luann was 13 in 1999. This younger era of Luann focused on topics among children in junior high school and within Luann's family at home. Since 1999 Luann has been slowly aging from 15 to 16 years old at perhaps the rate of one Luann month per one reader year, though this opposes what Evans has said on his blog. In the fall of 2013, it was made clear that Luann and her peers were seniors in high school, suggesting that the characters are around 17 years old and preparing for college. In June 2014, Greg and Karen Evans ran a story arc in which the high school characters attended their graduation. Luann was attending college as of September 3, 2014. On September 28, 2014, Greg Evans and his daughter Karen made an appearance in the strip, wishing Luann a happy 18th birthday.

== Topics ==
The strip has attained a degree of notoriety for its mixing of real-life topics with the lightness of being a teen in high school. Evans has sprinkled in such topics as Luann's concerns about her first menstruation, Dirk's jealousy (which has led to emotional abuse of Toni and physical violence toward Brad), birth control, drunk driving, handicaps, and other social/policy issues that are of interest to young people. Evans drew praise and some criticism in 1998 for a series of strips about Delta contracting Hodgkin lymphoma. Following the attacks of September 11, 2001, the character of Brad was inspired by the actions of the FDNY to become a firefighter, and there have been extended storylines following him. On November 14, 2001, the satirical newspaper The Onion ran a story supposedly detailing Evans' struggle to address the events of 9/11 in his strip.

== Musical ==
In 2006, Evans—with the help of arranger/orchestrator Justin Gray—wrote a musical based on the strip, titled Luann: Scenes in a Teen's Life, produced by Center ARTES and performed at the California Center for the Arts in Escondido, California. It was performed by local drama students from Rancho Buena Vista High School. An original cast recording, titled Scenes in a Teen's Life, was made. In March 2008, Palomar College, in San Marcos, California, performed this musical. It was the musical's college theater debut. Luann: Scenes In A Teen's Life was next scheduled to be performed by Huntington Beach Playhouse in August 2008. Its South San Diego High School debut was in May 2010.

== Books ==
There are 23 books featuring Luann:

List of Luann books
Title	Publication date	Publisher	ISBN
Meet Luann	1986	Berkley Books	ISBN 978-0-425-08878-4
Why Me? (Luann, No 2)	August 1986	Berkley Books	ISBN 978-0-425-08879-1
Is It Friday Yet? (Luann, No 3)	January 1987	Berkley Books	ISBN 978-0-425-09420-4
Luann: Who Invented Brothers, Anyway?	June 1989	Tor Books	ISBN 978-0-8125-7225-4
Luann: School and Other Problems	August 1989	Tor Books	ISBN 978-0-8125-0208-4
Luann: Homework Is Ruining My Life	December 15, 1989	Tor Books	ISBN 978-0-8125-0635-8
Luann: So Many Malls, So Little Money	July 1990	Tor Books	ISBN 978-0-8125-0987-8
Luann: Pizza Isn't Everything But It Comes Close	January 15, 1991	Tor Books	ISBN 978-0-8125-1174-1
Luann: Dear Diary, The Following Is Top Secret	August 15, 1991	Tor Books	ISBN 978-0-8125-1416-2
Luann : There's Nothing Worse Than First Period P.E.	March 15, 1992	Tor Books	ISBN 978-0-8125-1731-6
Luann: Will We Be Tested On This?	January 15, 1992	Tor Books	ISBN 978-0-8125-1729-3
Luann: School's OK If You Can Stand the Food	November 15, 1992	Tor Books	ISBN 978-0-8125-1733-0
Luann: I'm Not Always Confused, I Just Look That Way	January 15, 1993	Tor Books	ISBN 978-0-8125-1734-7
Luann: My Bedroom and Other Environmental Hazards	March 15, 1993	Tor Books	ISBN 978-0-8125-1735-4
Luann: If Confusion Were a Class I'd Get an A	January 15, 1995	Tor Books	ISBN 978-0-8125-1732-3
Sometimes, You Just Have to Make Your Own Rules	April 1998	Rutledge Hill Press	ISBN 978-1-55853-616-6
Luann	September 1998	Rutledge Hill Press	ISBN 978-1-55853-667-8
Passion! Betrayal! Outrage! Revenge!	October 1, 1999	Rutledge Hill Press	ISBN 978-1-55853-787-3
Luann: Curves Ahead	September 2003	Andrews McMeel Publishing	ISBN 978-0-7407-3950-7
Luann 2: Dates and Other Disasters	September 2004	Andrews McMeel Publishing	ISBN 978-0-7407-4664-2
Luann 3L Sixteen Isn't Pretty	August 2006	Andrews McMeel Publishing	ISBN 978-0-7407-6193-5
Seriously...: Luann #4	August 2008	Andrews McMeel Publishing	ISBN 978-0-7407-7362-4
Luann – 25 Years	June 2011		ISBN 978-0-9845465-0-3
