= The Hunt for Xavier =

X-Men comic book storyline

- Cover of X-Men vol. 2, 84 (Feb 1999), art by Adam Kubert
- Publisher: Marvel Comics
- Publication date: December 1998 – February 1999
- Genre: Superhero; Crossover
- Title(s): The Uncanny X-Men #362-364; X-Men vol. 2, #82-84

"The Hunt For Xavier" is an X-Men storyline that ran in the fall of 1998.

According to script writer Joe Kelly, "The Hunt for Xavier" was the "last straw" that led to his and Steven Seagle deciding to leave Marvel Comics. The writers were frustrated with their loss of freedom in developing the story arcs.

== Plot ==
The X-Men attempt to find the location of Professor Xavier, who has been missing ever since the authorities arrested him in the wake of the Onslaught disaster. Their quest for him leads them once again into the path of Cerebro, the mutant detecting device used by the X-Men which has now gained sentient life. This time, it has gained a new form, as opposed to mimicking Charles Xavier and creating a team of fake X-Men. Cerebro has begun kidnapping mutants left and right to "catalogue" them and has begun targeting members of the newly reformed Brotherhood of Evil Mutants, who reveal to have Xavier as their prisoner/reluctant mentor.

The X-Men split in two as they are joined by the young mutant Nina, who was Xavier's fellow prisoner during his time in jail. As they find out the location of Cerebro's lair, Cerebro says his plan is to catalog (IE digitalize and store) all humans on Earth, hence bringing about a perverted version of a mutant utopia for Xavier.

While the X-Men distract Cerebro and his drone units, Nina restores Xavier's mental powers (which were deactivated by Onslaught) and together, they force Cerebro to mindlink with all of humanity. Experiencing all the individual souls of humanity causes Cerebro to stop his evil scheme and literally fade away into oblivion. Xavier agrees to return home with the X-Men, reuniting the team with their mentor.

== Reading order ==
1. Uncanny X-Men #362
2. X-Men (Vol. 2) #82
3. Uncanny X-Men #363
4. X-Men (Vol. 2) #83
5. Uncanny X-Men #364
6. X-Men (Vol. 2) #84
