= Wiley Miller =

American cartoonist

Wiley Miller's 2005 Non Sequitur collection

David Wiley Miller (born April 15, 1951) is an American cartoonist whose work is characterized by wry wit and trenchant social satire, is best known for his comic strip Non Sequitur, which he signs Wiley. Non Sequitur is the only cartoon to win National Cartoonists Society Divisional Awards in both the comic strip and comic panel categories, and Miller is the only cartoonist to win an NCS Divisional Award in his first year of syndication.

== Editorial cartoons ==
A California native, Wiley studied art at Virginia Commonwealth University and worked for several Hollywood educational film studios before relocating to North Carolina in 1976 to work as an editorial cartoonist and staff artist for the Greensboro News & Record. In 1978, Wiley was hired by the Santa Rosa, California Press Democrat as staff artist and editorial cartoonist. Fenton (1982) was his first syndicated strip. In 1985, he was hired as an editorial cartoonist at the San Francisco Examiner.

== Non Sequitur ==
In 1991, Wiley launched his popular Non Sequitur strip, eventually syndicated to 700 newspapers as well as published on Go Comics and distributed via email. The strip has a history of politically leaning, but more recently it has been a much more traditional strip with recurring characters. In 1994, Miller pioneered the use of process color in comic strips, and developed a format in 1995 that allows one cartoon to be used in two different ways for both panel dimensions and strip dimensions.

In February 2019 many newspapers dropped Non Sequitur after the Sunday comic dated February 10, 2019 included a hidden profane message aimed at President Donald Trump. As of February 14, at least 40 newspapers said they were dropping Non Sequitur, including The Boston Globe, the Chicago Tribune, and the Los Angeles Times. Miller said the Trump comment was an oversight, something he had forgotten about and had intended to remove. However, The Hill noted that he had teased the strip in a now-deleted tweet pointing out an "Easter egg" in the image.

Andrews McMeel Syndication, the company that publishes Non Sequitur, confirmed to The Washington Post that numerous papers had dropped the strip and apologized for not catching the insult in the first place. "We are sorry we missed the language in our editing process," the company's statement said. "If we had discovered it, we would not have distributed the cartoon without it being removed. We apologize to 'Non Sequitur's' clients and readers for our oversight."

== Books ==
Books by Miller include Dead Lawyers and Other Pleasant Thoughts (1993), The Non Sequitur Survival Guide for the Nineties (1995), Non Sequitur’s Beastly Things (1999, foreword by Jules Feiffer), The Legal Lampoon (2002), Why We’ll Never Understand Each Other (2003), Lucy and Danae: Something Silly This Way Comes (2005), Homer, the Reluctant Soul (2005) and Extraordinary Adventures Of Ordinary Basil (2006).

In 2004, Wiley Miller, his wife Victoria Coviello, and their four Jack Russell Terriers moved from Santa Barbara, California, to Kennebunkport, Maine. He explained the relocation to Stephanie Bouchard of the Maine Sunday Telegram:

Part of the attraction for both of us is in a creative sense. Santa Barbara is beautiful. As far as year-round climate, it's perfect, but there's no real change. These dramatic changes really spark the creative nature because it's change. It gives you a fresh look at the world. It's invigorating. Santa Barbara is too nice; hard to get work done. We spent eight years in Iowa. Iowa is always overcast; it's awful. Here, in winter, we don't go out much so we get more work done.

When Bouchard asked him about the Maine setting in some of his strips, he responded:

I created a series of characters that came from our visits to Maine. Offshore Flo is patterned after the Maine Diner in Wells. I wanted to capture the essence of Maine people's genuineness – down-to-earth, good-natured people – and work in the accent. I heard from displaced New Englanders. I got E-mails from people who said how dead-on the accent was and how dead wrong. It's tricky working phonetically because you still have to be legible, finding the balance of how far to take it. It's set in Whatchacallit, Maine. I realized there had never been this setting in comics. I hate following. More fun blazing a new trail. Nobody's ever been to Maine in the comics.

As of 2016, Wiley Miller and his family had moved yet again, and were no longer residing in Maine, but were living in Palmetto, Georgia.

== Awards ==
Wiley was named Best Editorial Cartoonist by the California Newspaper Publishers Association in 1988 and won the Robert F. Kennedy Journalism Award for editorial cartooning in 1991. The National Cartoonists Society honored Non Sequitur with four awards in the first six years of publication, including their Newspaper Panel Cartoon Award for 1995, 1996 and 1998, and it was nominated for the same award in 1999 and 2002 and won their Newspaper Comic Strip Award for 1992.

Non Sequitur is the only comic strip to win its division during the first year of publication, and it is the only comic feature to win in two divisions, Best Comic Strip for 1992 and Best Newspaper Panel Cartoon for 1995, 1996 and 1998.

- 1988: California Newspaper Publishers Association
- 1991: Robert F. Kennedy Journalism Award, for editorial cartooning
- 1992: National Cartoonists Society, Newspaper Comic Strip Award
- 1995: National Cartoonists Society, Newspaper Panel Cartoon Award
- 1996: National Cartoonists Society, Newspaper Panel Cartoon Award
- 1998: National Cartoonists Society, Newspaper Panel Cartoon Award
- 2013: Reuben Award for "Outstanding Cartoonist of the Year"
