= A Family Matter (comics) =

1998 graphic novel

A Family Matter is a 1998 graphic novel by American cartoonist Will Eisner.

== Plot/Premise ==
A family comes together for the birthday of the ninetieth birthday of its patriarch. The man's children are now mostly fully grown and middle-aged, and are using the gathering to curry favor with him. Old grievances, rivalries and resentments come to the surface.

== Cast ==
- AL - Oldest son, works at a bar. The Family haven't seen him for ten years.
- Greta - Oldest daughter, takes care of the father after his stroke have him in a wheelchair.
- Molly and Charlie - Married with two kids named Sherry and baby, Molly is a daughter in the story.
- Selena - Young daughter, work at a Marylou Boutique.
- Leo - Son and Lawyer.
- Sammy - Young nephew and in therapy.
