= Greg Evans (cartoonist) =

American cartoonist (born 1947)

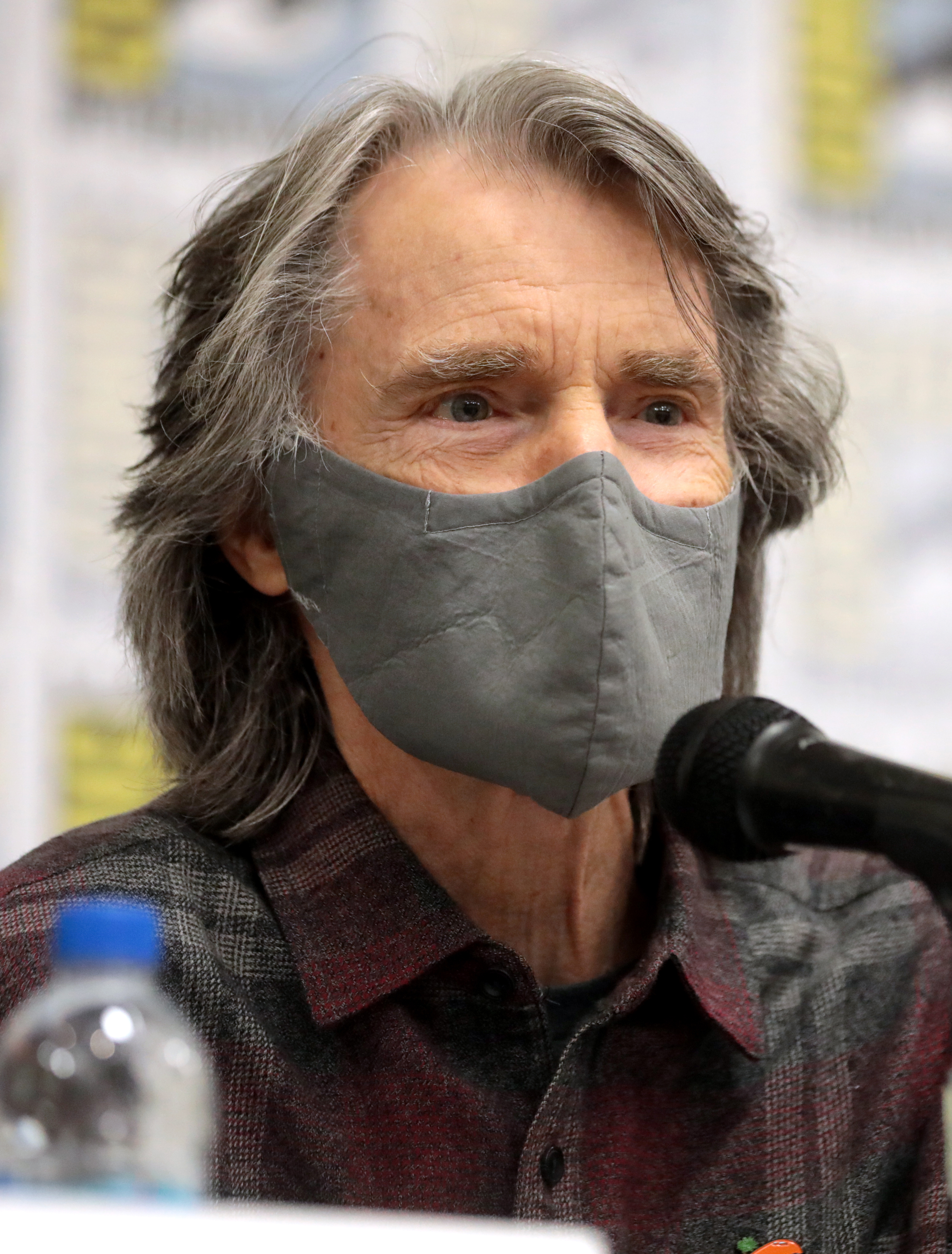
Evans at the 2021 San Diego Comic-Con.

Greg Evans (born November 13, 1947) is an American cartoonist and the creator of the syndicated comic strip Luann. He received the 2003 National Cartoonists Society Reuben Award for the strip. He has been nominated four other times for the same award.

== Career ==
In 100 Years of American Newspaper Comics, Dennis Wepman wrote that Evans "taught junior and senior high school art in his native California, worked as promotion manager and graphic artist for a TV station in Colorado, and entertained with a robot at trade shows and fairs before he sold Luann to News America Syndicate in 1984."

Evans wrote a musical based on Luann, Luann: Scenes in a Teen's Life, which debuted March 2008 at Palomar College in San Marcos, California. It was directed by Dana Case.

Prior to Luann, Evans published the comic strip Fogarty, distributed free to high school newspapers. It featured the character Mr. Fogarty, who continues in the same role as a character in Luann.

In 2005, Evans was awarded the Inkpot Award.

Evans is a graduate of California State University, Northridge.

== Personal life ==
Evans lives in San Marcos, California, near San Diego. With his wife Betty he has three children, including daughter Karen, whose own experiences as a teenager influenced Luann. He also has two grandchildren. They are named Julie and Eric.

One of Evans' children, Rhonda, born around the time Evans had met his wife in college, was put up for adoption. 30 years later, Rhonda discovered that she was adopted. When reading the Sunday comics, she realized that an artist's name matched the name on her adoption papers. She contacted Evans, who was shocked. Evans and his wife eventually met Rhonda, whose story was told in an episode of the PAX-TV series, It's a Miracle.
