= The Far Side Gallery 2 =

1986 book by Gary Larson

- Author: Gary Larson
- Language: English
- Publisher: Andrews, McMeel, and Parker
- Publication date: October 1986
- Publication place: United States
- Media type: Print (Paperback)
- ISBN: 0-8362-2085-4 (first edition, paperback)
- OCLC: 14264837
- Dewey Decimal: 741.5/973 19
- LC Class: NC1429.L32 A4 1986a
- Preceded by: The Far Side Gallery
- Followed by: The Far Side Gallery 3

The Far Side Gallery 2 is the second anthology of Gary Larson's The Far Side comic strips. Cartoons from previous collections Bride of The Far Side, Valley of The Far Side, and It Came from the Far Side are featured, all of which were printed from 1985 to 1987. The foreword was written by Stephen King. The cover shows an explorer/scientist opening a coffin with a picture of a cow pharaoh on the front. Inside, there is a mummy cow.

== Reception ==
Mordecai Richler wrote in 1987:

I have a hunch that Gary Larson, no stranger to irony, is more amusing if his cartoons are caught one at a time rather than gathered in a fat collection, as in THE FAR SIDE GALLERY and THE FAR SIDE GALLERY 2 (Andrews, McMeel & Parker, $9.95 each). The problem is that once you have tuned into his humor it becomes somewhat predictable.

Nevertheless, the book sold well.
