= The Complete Far Side =

Book by Gary Larson

- Author: Gary Larson
- Language: English
- Publisher: Andrews, and McMeel
- Publication date: September 2003
- Publication place: United States
- Media type: Print (Paperback)
- ISBN: 0-7407-2113-5 (first edition)
- OCLC: 51898839
- Dewey Decimal: 741.5/973 21
- LC Class: NC1429.L32 A4 2003
- Preceded by: The Far Side Gallery 5

The Complete Far Side: 1980–1994 is a set of two hard-cover books which contains the entire run of The Far Side comic strip by Gary Larson. The two volumes are presented in a slipcase. The collection includes more than 1,100 comics that had not previously appeared in any other Far Side books. The comics are presented in chronological order by year of publication. The foreword was written by Steve Martin.

In 2014, The Complete Far Side was reissued in a slipcased paperback edition. This edition is spread over three volumes instead of two.
