= The Far Side Gallery =

1984 book by Gary Larson

- Author: Gary Larson
- Language: English
- Publisher: Andrews and McMeel
- Publication date: November 1984
- Publication place: United States
- Media type: Print (Paperback)
- ISBN: 0-8362-2062-5 (first edition, paperback)
- OCLC: 11427869
- Dewey Decimal: 741.5/973 19
- LC Class: NC1429.L32 A4 1984a
- Followed by: The Far Side Gallery 2

The Far Side Gallery (1984) is the first in a series of collections of Gary Larson's The Far Side comic strips. The five volumes were published between 1984 and 1995.

In the first volume, cartoons from the previous books The Far Side, Beyond the Far Side, and In Search of the Far Side are featured, all of which were printed from 1982 to 1984.
