= The Far Side Gallery 4 =

1993 book by Gary Larson

- Author: Gary Larson
- Language: English
- Publisher: Andrews and McMeel
- Publication date: October 1993
- Publication place: United States
- Media type: Print (Paperback and Hardback)
- ISBN: 0-8362-1724-1 (first edition, paperback) ISBN 0-8362-1726-8 (first edition, hardback)
- OCLC: 28958976
- Dewey Decimal: 741.5/973 20
- LC Class: NC1429.L32 A4 1993b
- Preceded by: The Far Side Gallery 3
- Followed by: The Far Side Gallery 5

The Far Side Gallery 4 is the fourth anthology of Gary Larson's The Far Side comic strips.

Cartoons from previous collections Wiener Dog Art, Unnatural Selections, and Wildlife Preserves are featured, all of which were printed from 1990 to 1992. It has more than 20 full-color pages.

The foreword was written by comedian Robin Williams, who called Larson "a demented Dr. Doolittle". One million copies of the book were printed in the first printing.
