= The Far Side Gallery 3 =

1988 book by Gary Larson

- Author: Gary Larson
- Language: English
- Publisher: Andrews and McMeel
- Publication date: October 1988
- Publication place: United States
- Media type: Print (Paperback and Hardback)
- Pages: 191
- ISBN: 0-8362-1831-0 (first edition, paperback) ISBN 0-8362-1810-8 (first edition, hardback)
- OCLC: 18610076
- Dewey Decimal: 741.5/973 20
- LC Class: NC1429.L32 A4 1988a
- Preceded by: The Far Side Gallery 2
- Followed by: The Far Side Gallery 4

The Far Side Gallery 3 is the third anthology of Gary Larson's The Far Side comic strips, published by Andrews and McMeel. Cartoons from previous collections Hound of the Far Side, The Far Side Observer, and Night of the Crash-Test Dummies are featured, all of which were printed from 1987 to 1989.

The volume is dedicated to guitar maker Jimmy D'Aquisto, and the lengthy foreword was written by Stephen Jay Gould. The cover depicts a parody of Leonardo da Vinci's Mona Lisa, substituting a cow for the female subject.
