= Veronika (cow) =

Cow that has used tools (born 2010s)

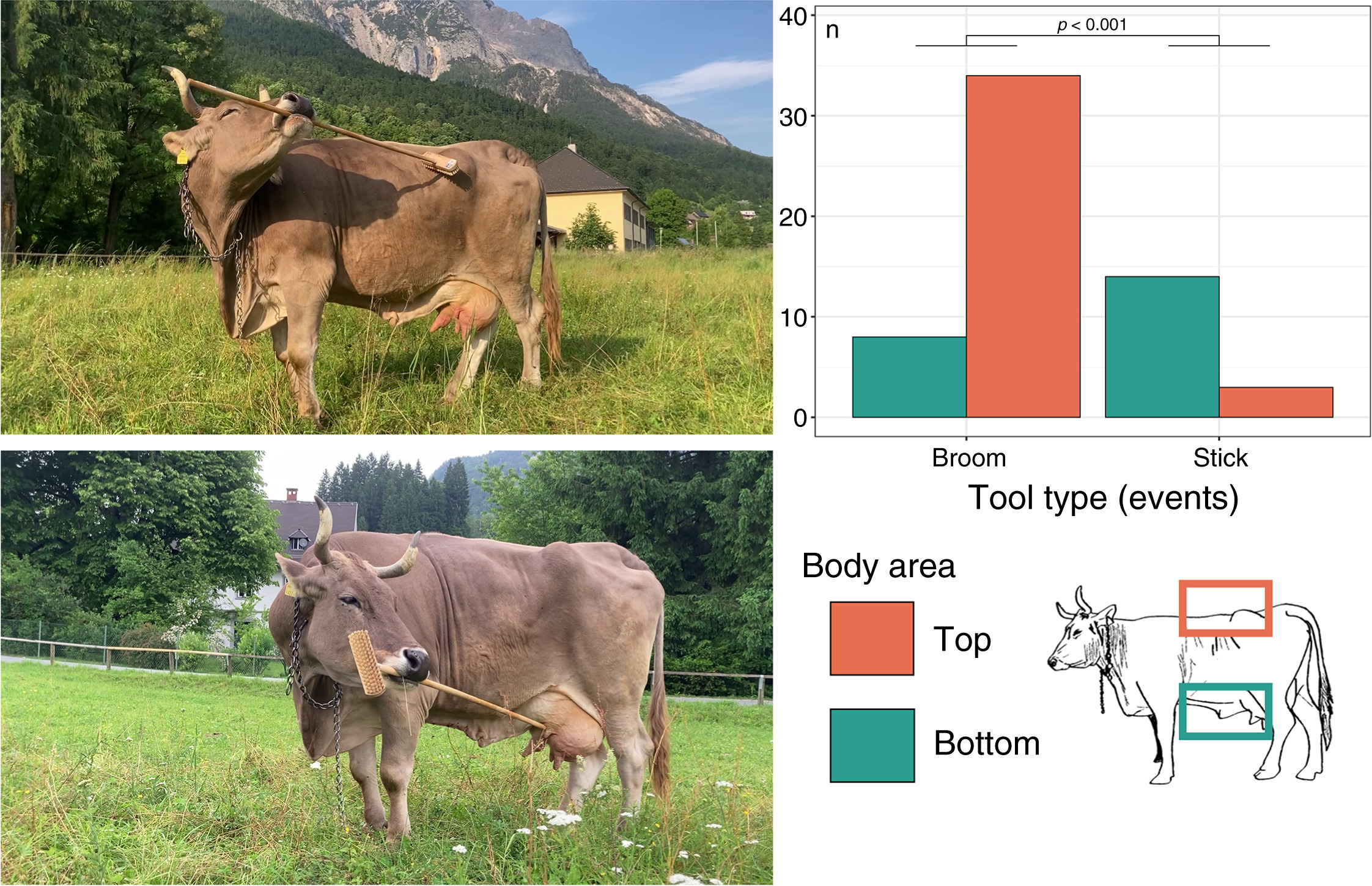
Veronika uses a broom to scratch herself, using the coarse brush on her tough hide and the wooden handle on her udder and underbelly.

Veronika (Note: German pronunciation: [veˈʁoːnika].) (born 2012 or 2013) is a pet Braunvieh cow in the Austrian town of Nötsch im Gailtal. She became known in January 2026 after being observed using tools to scratch herself. The incident has been described as the first documented case of cattle using tools, and has led scientists to reassess the intelligence of cows.

== Life ==
Veronika, a brown cow, was born in 2012 or 2013 and lives in the Austrian town of Nötsch im Gailtal, near the Italian border. She is kept as a pet by Witgar Wiegele, a farmer and baker. Veronika started playing with branches that had fallen off trees years before the study was published in 2026, and worked out in about 2016 how to use them as tools to scratch herself. Wiegele has also reported that Veronika can recognise the voices of her family members and runs over to them when they call for her.

== Research and tool use ==
Video of Veronika scratching herself

After cognitive biologist Alice Auersperg found video recordings of Veronika using tools, she and her postdoctoral student Antonio J. Osuna-Mascaró travelled by car to Nötsch im Gailtal to study the cow and did so for two weeks. They gave her a broom and she would pick it up, using her tongue to reposition it until firmly holding it with her teeth. The cow would move the broom around by moving her head, and would use the broom to scratch regions of her body that were normally unreachable to her. She would use the bristles to scratch the tough parts of her skin and would use the wooden handle of the broom to more carefully scratch the softer parts of her: the udder and underbelly. The researchers initially thought that this was a mistake, Veronika picking up the wrong side of the broom, but came to the conclusion that Veronika appears to do it on purpose.

The study was published in the journal Current Biology in January 2026. It described the behaviour as the first documented use of a tool by a cow. The lead author of the study, Antonio J. Osuna-Mascaró, has written that "What this tells us is that cows have the potential to innovate tool use, and we have ignored this fact for thousands of years ... There are around 1.5 billion heads of cattle in the world, and humans have lived with them for at least 10,000 years. It's shocking that we're only discovering this now." As of January 2026, the authors plan on further studying Veronika's behaviour and request contact from people who have observed farm animals using tools. Before the study, chimpanzees and humans were the only mammals known to use tools for multiple purposes.

The authors do not believe that Veronika is an extremely intelligent cow, but instead believe that cows have always been capable of tool use and that humans have not noticed this ability. While the cause of Veronika's learning to use the tools is unknown, Osuna-Mascaró has said that the cow's owner "provid[ed] the special conditions that enabled Veronika to express herself". The owner gave the cow rakes and sticks which allowed her to improve her ability to use them. Veronika is 13 years old as of 2026, much older than what most farm animals live to, possibly giving her more time to develop the skill since acquiring it about a decade earlier. Farm animals also often live in places where they cannot interact with and manipulate objects, such as in factory farms.

== Reaction ==
Jill Pruetz, a primatologist at Texas State University, has said that "I am not completely surprised that cattle can use tools—after living in close proximity to my two cows for about seven years now, I have a lot more respect for bovine intelligence!" Scientific American has paraphrased further comments from Pruetz, saying that the "paper illustrates the need for enrichment for the welfare of cattle". Biologist Marc Bekoff saw Veronika's behaviour as a clear example of tool-use.

== See also ==
- "Cow tools", a 1982 The Far Side cartoon
- List of individual bovines
