= The Far Side Gallery 5 =

1995 book by Gary Larson

- Author: Gary Larson
- Language: English
- Publisher: Andrews, and McMeel
- Publication date: September 1995
- Publication place: United States
- Media type: Print (Paperback and Hardback)
- ISBN: 0-8362-0425-5 (first edition, paperback) ISBN 0-8362-0426-3 (first edition, hardback)
- OCLC: [https://www.worldcat.org/oclc/333135%0A10 333135 10]
- Dewey Decimal: 741.5/973 20
- LC Class: NC1429.L32 A4 1995
- Preceded by: The Far Side Gallery 4

The Far Side Gallery 5 is the fifth and final anthology of Gary Larson's The Far Side comic strips. It was published by Andrews and McMeel in September 1995.

Cartoons from previous collections Cows of Our Planet, The Chickens are Restless, and The Curse of Madame "C" are featured, all of which were printed from 1992 to 1994. The foreword was written by Jane Goodall, who was commonly satirized in Larson's comics.

The cover shows several flies in a movie theater watching a movie, in which a fly was calling for help because it was in a spoonful of tomato soup.
