= Toolmaking =

Toolmaking (sometimes styled as tool-making or tool making) may refer to:

- Tool making
  - Tool § History
- Tool use by animals
- Tool and die maker
