= Nötsch im Gailtal =

- Municipality
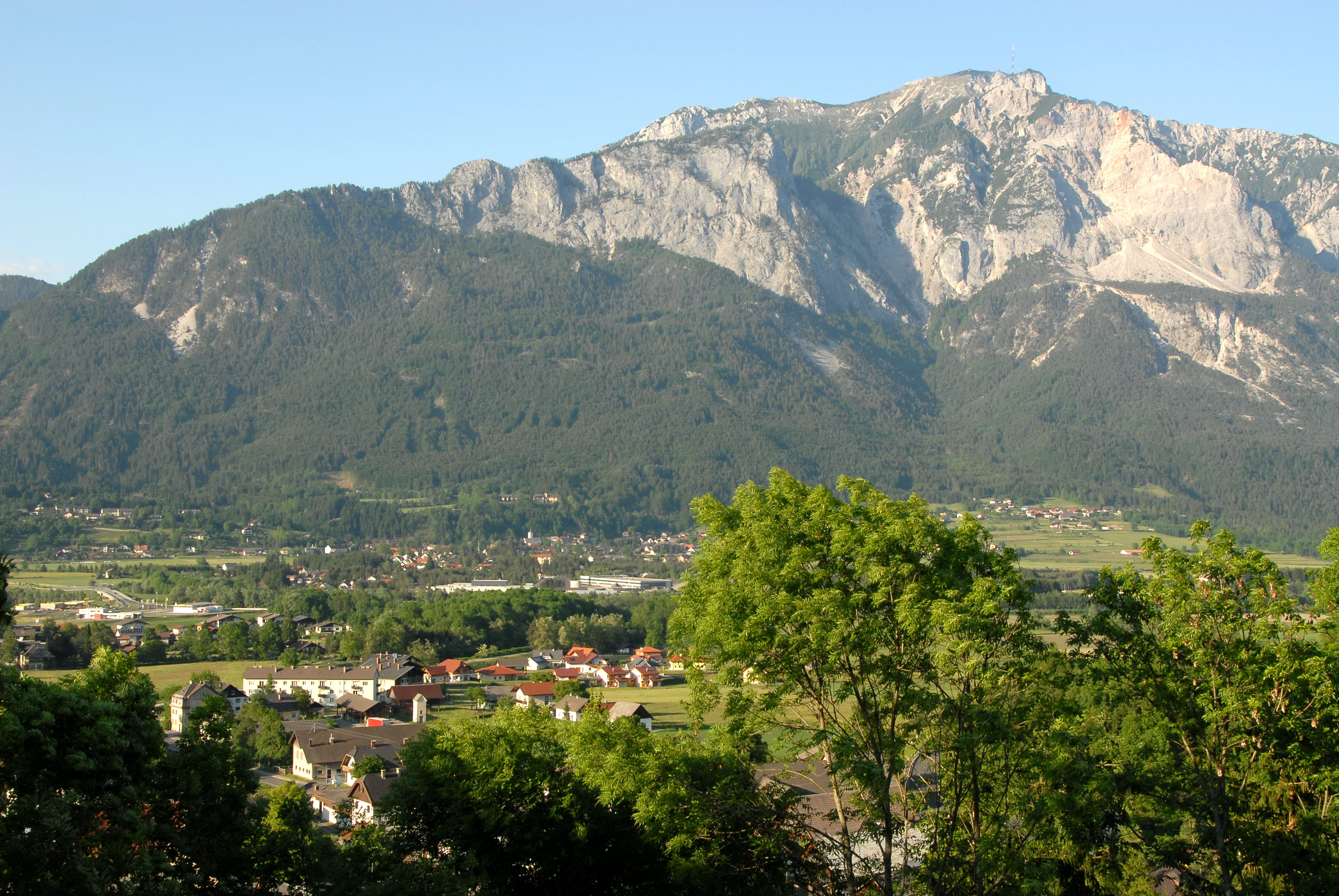
- Dobratsch with Nötsch im Gailtal

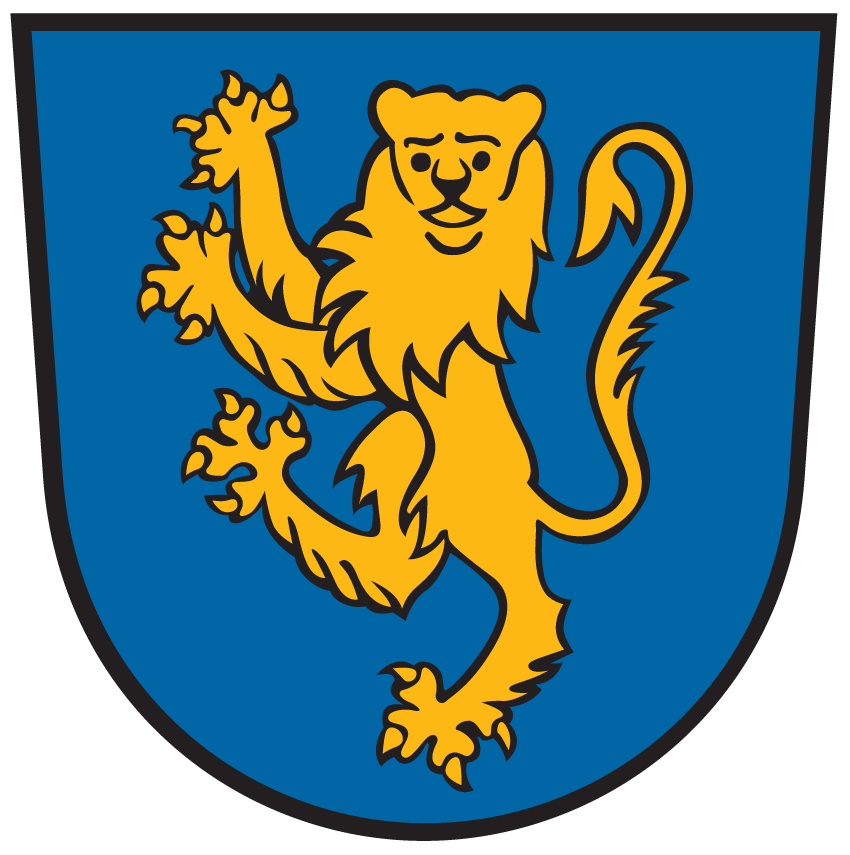
- Coat of arms

- Location within Austria
- Coordinates: 46°35′N 13°37′E
- Country: Austria
- State: Carinthia
- District: Villach-Land

Government
  - Mayor: Alfred Altersberger (ÖVP)

Area
  - Total: 42.72 km^{2} (16.49 sq mi)
- Elevation: 569 m (1,867 ft)

Population (2024)
  - Total: 2,332
  - Density: 54.59/km^{2} (141.4/sq mi)
- Time zone: UTC+1 (CET)
  - Summer (DST): UTC+2 (CEST)
- Postal code: 9611
- Area code: 04256, 04263
- Website: www.noetsch.at

Nötsch im Gailtal (Slovene: Čajna) is a market town in the district of Villach-Land in the Austrian state of Carinthia.

== Geography ==
Located west of Villach, the municipal area stretches along the lower Gail valley in southern Carinthia at the foot of the Villacher Alpe (Dobratsch) massif, the eastern extension of the Gailtal Alps. It comprises the cadastral communities of Kerschdorf (Črešnje), Saak (Čače), and Sankt Georgen (Šentjurij).

Nötsch can be reached from Villach and Süd Autobahn (A2) via the Gailtal Straße (B111) highway. In the north, a mountain roads leads up to the high valley of Bad Bleiberg. Nötsch station is a stop on the Gailtalbahn railway line from Arnoldstein to Kötschach-Mauthen.

== History ==
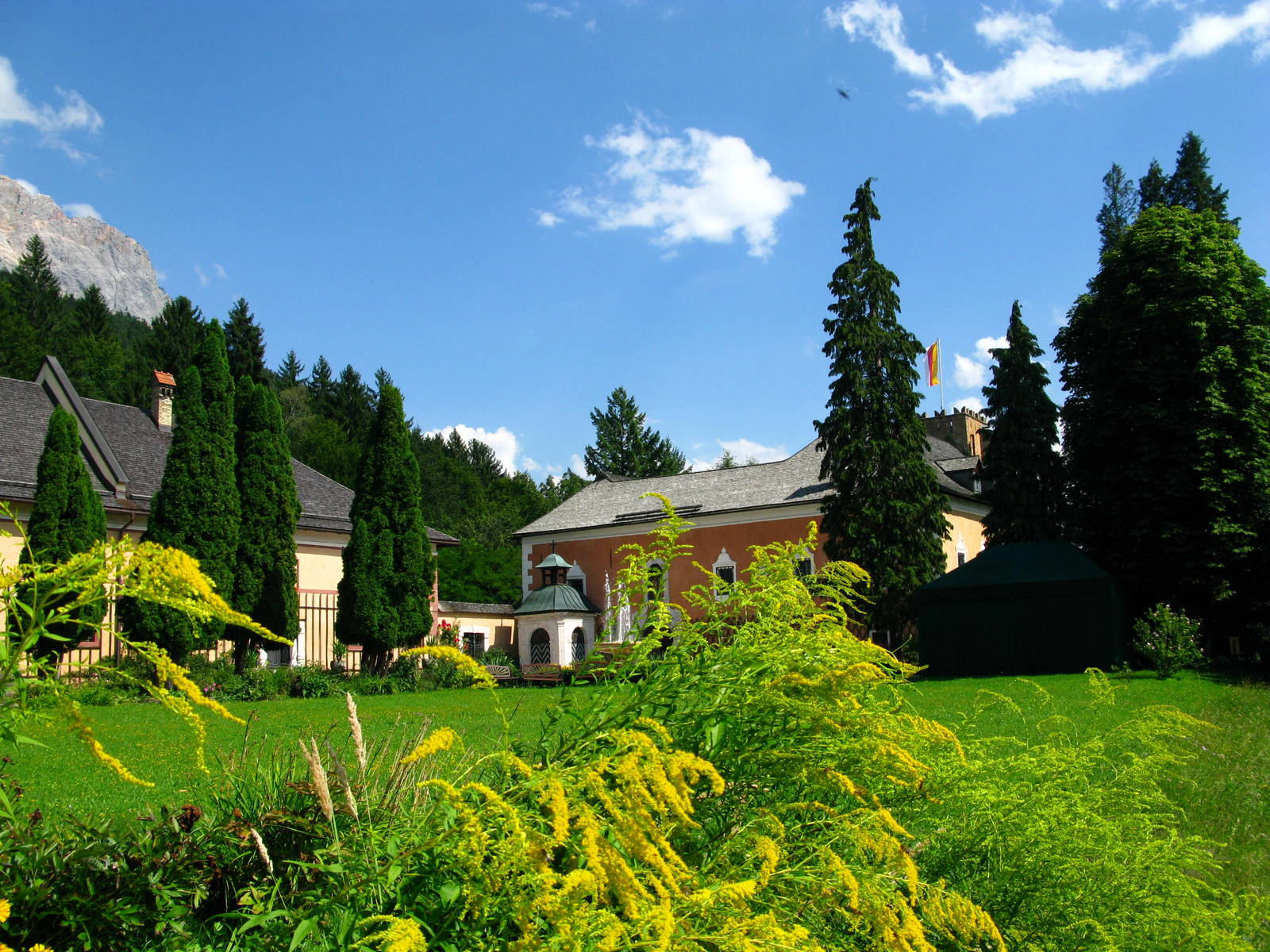
Wasserleonburg Castle

The settlement in the Duchy of Carinthia was first mentioned in a 1253 deed together with Lewenburg castle, present-day Wasserleonburg, then a fief of the Prince-Bishops of Bamberg. The area was devastated in the 1348 Friuli earthquake, which caused a massive landslide at Mt. Dobratsch and a flood of the Gail river.

Wasserleonburg Castle, located high above the village of Saak, was rebuilt in the 14th century. During a series of ownership of several Villach merchant families, it was significantly enlarged in the 16th and 17th centuries, including a Renaissance courtyard with an open loggia, a Mannerist facade, and a castle chapel. Up to today, the complex is privately owned and used as a hotel; after his abdication, Edward VIII, Duke of Windsor, and his wife Wallis Simpson spent their honeymoon here from 5 June to 7 September 1937.

From the early 20th century onwards, Nötsch temporarily was home of a group of Expressionist painters including Anton Kolig (1886–1950). The Nötscher Kreis was in touch with the Hagenbund group of artists around Oskar Kokoschka, Anton Faistauer, and Egon Schiele. In a bombing raid on Nötsch on December 17, 1944, several residents were injured and killed.

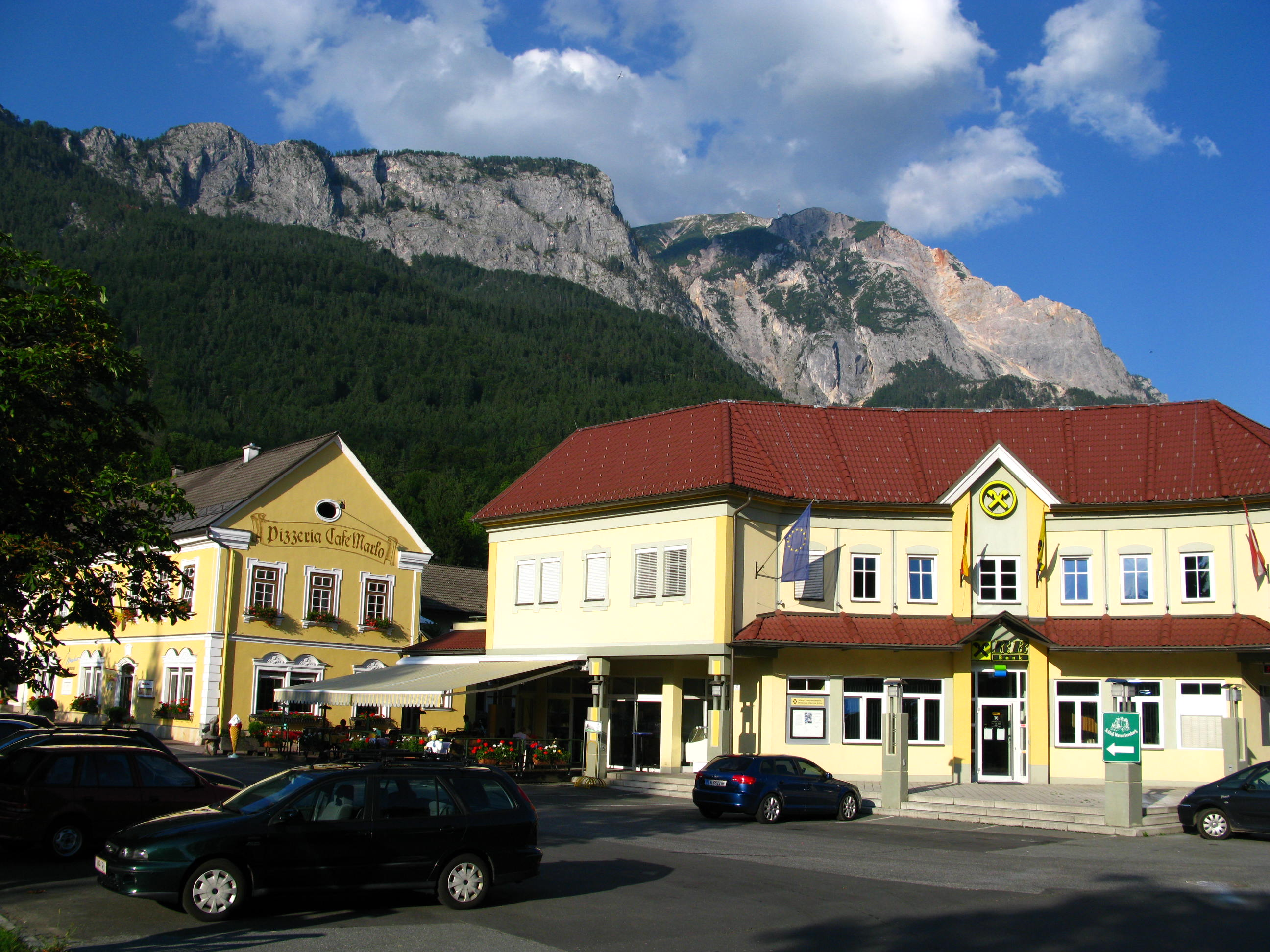
Nötsch

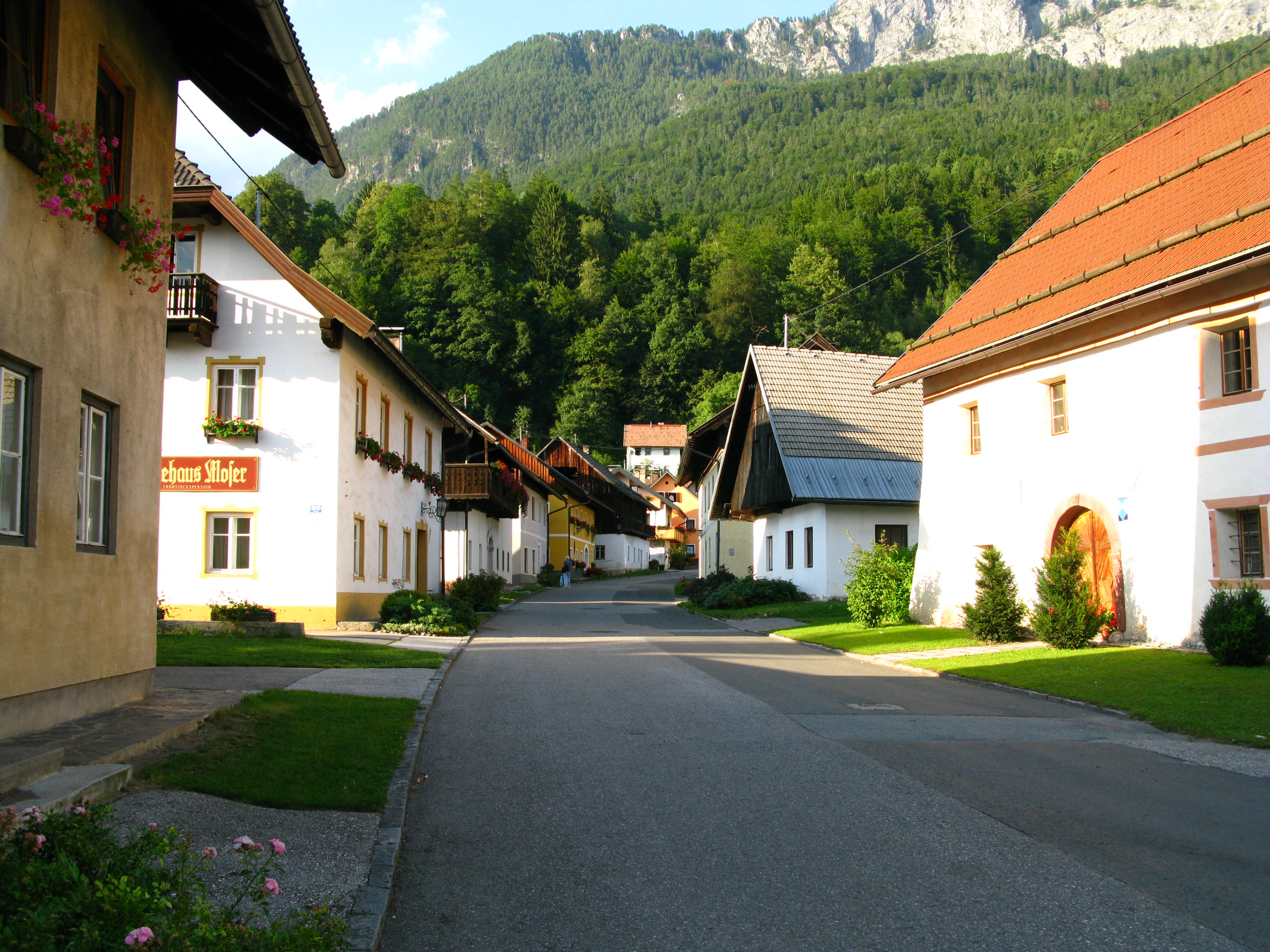
Saak

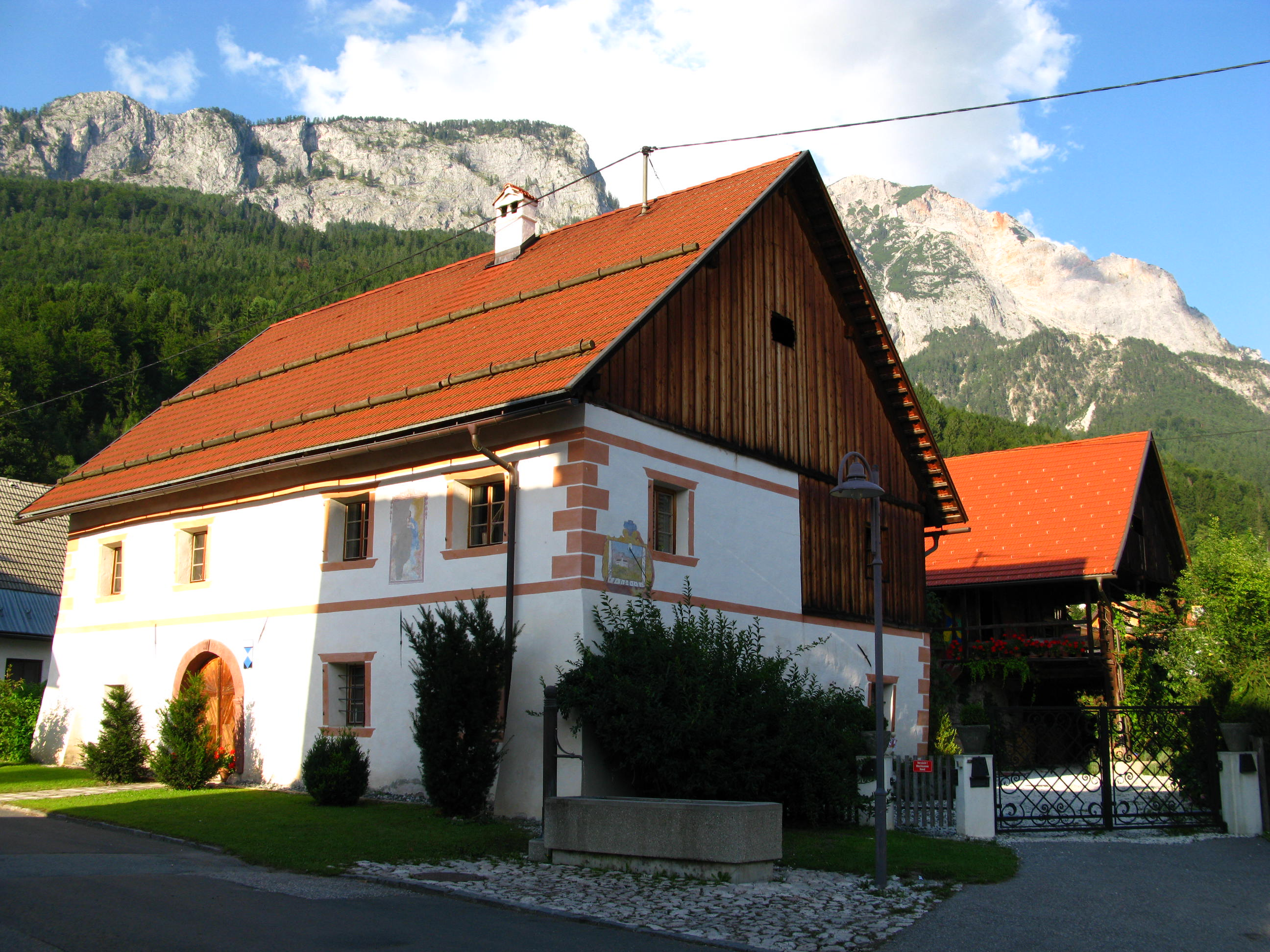
Old farmhouse in Saak

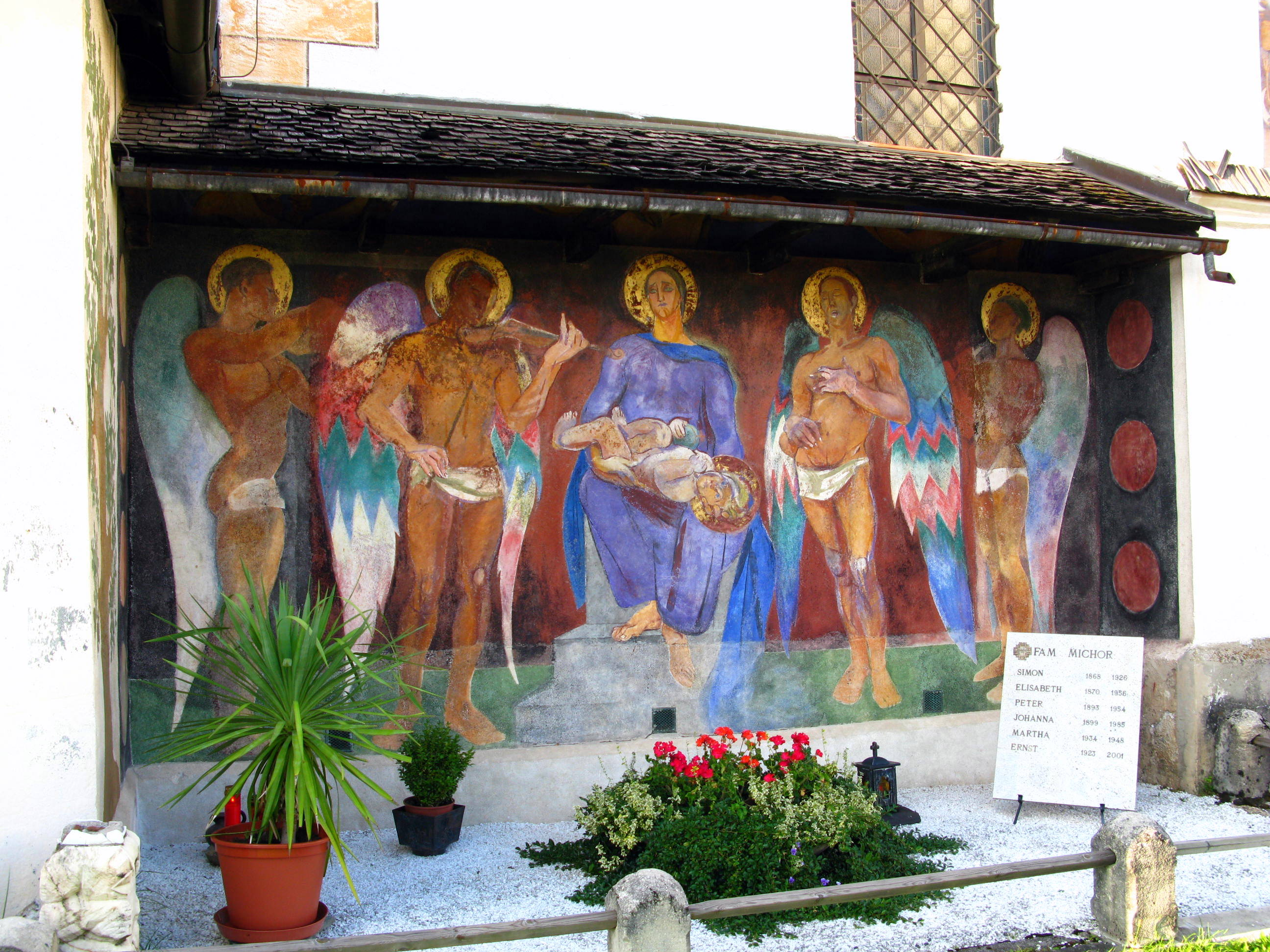
Fresco by Anton Kolig

== Politics ==
Seats in the municipal assembly (Gemeinderat) as of 2021 local elections:

- Austrian People's Party (ÖVP): 9
- Social Democratic Party of Austria (SPÖ): 7
- Greens (GRÜNE): 2
- Freedom Party of Austria (FPÖ): 1

== Culture ==
=== Museums ===
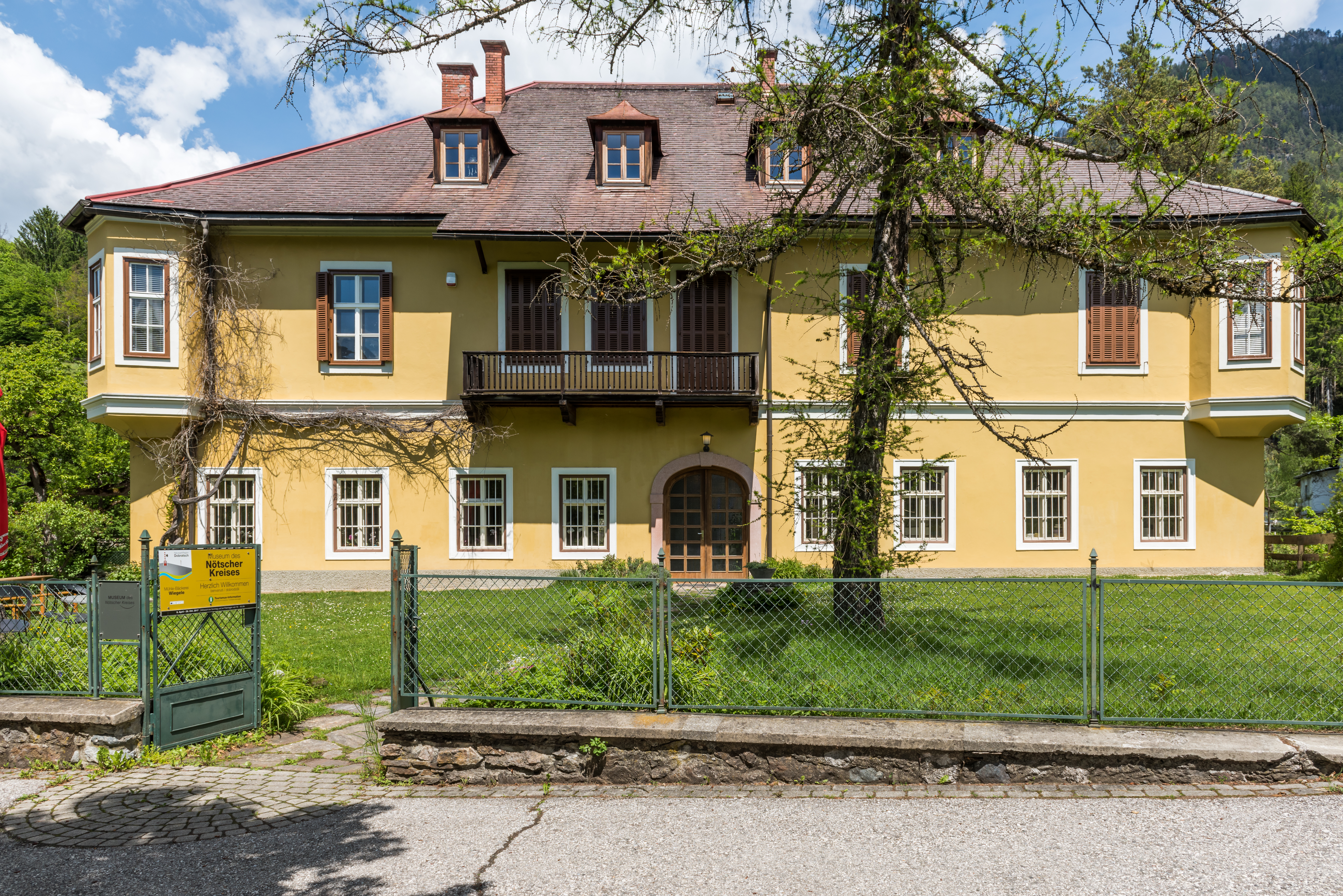
Haus Wiegele, which houses the museum of the Nötscher Kreis

- Museum des Nötscher Kreises

=== Sacral buildings ===
- Hl. Kanzianus, Saak
- Windische Kirche, Dobratsch
- Hl. Georg, St. Georgen im Gailtal
- Hl. Bartholomäus, Emmersdorf
- Hl. Nikolaus, Kerschdorf

== Notable natives and residents ==
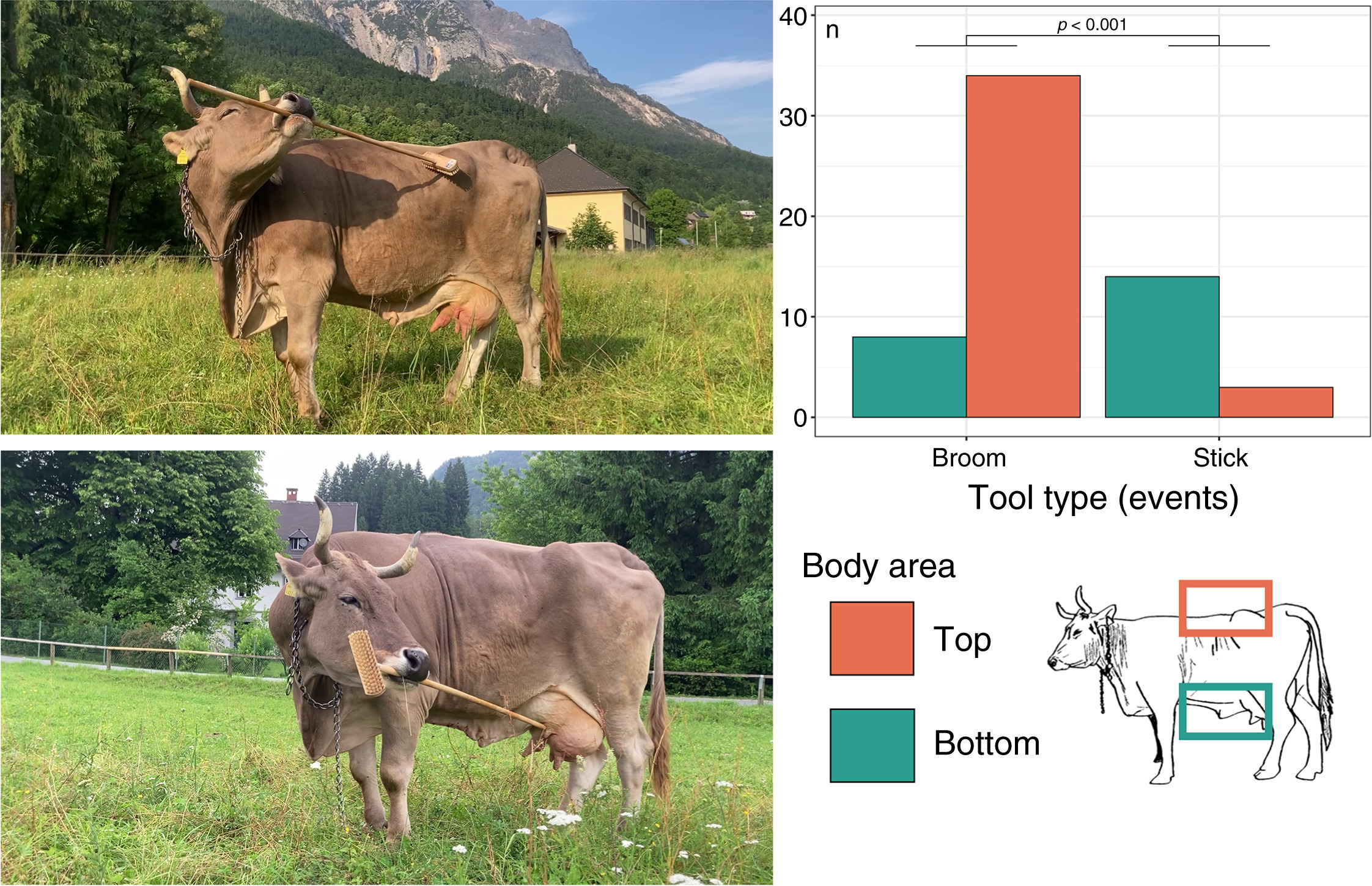
Veronika uses a broom to scratch herself, using the coarse brush on her tough hide and the wooden handle on her udder and underbelly.

- Anton Kolig (1886–1950), Austrian expressionist painter, part of the Nötscher Kreis, lived the later years of his life and died in Nötsch im Gailtal.
- Veronika (Born 2012 or 2013), a pet Braunvieh cow known for being the first cow to have been observed using tools.
