= The Prehistory of The Far Side =

1989 book by Gary Larson

The Prehistory of the Far Side
- First edition cover
- Author: Gary Larson
- Cover artist: Chip Clark/Ernie Block
- Language: English
- Publisher: Andrews and McMeel
- Publication date: August 1989
- Publication place: United States
- Media type: Print (Paperback and Hardback)
- Pages: 288 p. (first edition, paperback)
- ISBN: 0-8362-1851-5 (first edition, paperback) ISBN 0-8362-1861-2 (first edition, hardback)
- OCLC: 20378773
- Dewey Decimal: 741.5/092 20
- LC Class: NC1429.L32 A4 1989a

The Prehistory of The Far Side: A 10th Anniversary Exhibit is a 1989 book chronicling the origin and evolution of The Far Side (including cartoonist Gary Larson's first strip, Nature's Way), giving inside information about the cartooning process and featuring a gallery of Larson's favorite Far Side cartoons from the 1980s.

== Part 1: Origin of the Species ==
Larson recounts his childhood by showing several pictures supposedly drawn by him when he was a child. (Example: A picture of a boy sitting on a tire in pitch blackness sports the caption "I believe this is my earliest memory of riding in the car when my family took our annual vacation.") He shows panels of Nature's Way and talks about his early struggles as a cartoonist before he established himself in the field. While on vacation from his regular job as an investigator for the local humane society ("to whom I never disclosed the fact that on the way to the job interview I ran over a dog"), he left his one and only copy of his portfolio at the headquarters of the San Francisco Chronicle, waiting several days until they decided to hire him. After returning home, he received a letter that his local newspaper had decided to discontinue Nature's Way. Larson says that if the letter had arrived a week earlier, "I never would have made the trip to San Francisco. The wind would definitely have gone out of my sails."

== Part 2: Evolution ==
Larson explains the creative process he goes through in making cartoons, showing the original doodles in his sketchbook alongside the final published versions. Sometimes he makes large changes to his initial idea, other times the differences are more subtle. (Example: A sketch of "If Dogs Drove," showing canine drivers hanging their heads out the window, was changed to "When dogs go to work," which depicts a bus-full of dogs with their heads hanging out the window.) He discusses the reasons for the changes he makes, and in a few cases he admits that he now prefers an earlier version, or that the final version could have been changed further.

He also shows doodles that he never published, most of which he admits weren't that funny. ("Anyone who attaches more significance to them needs to get out more often.") He then shows several cartoons that were based on little short stories he wrote for a change of pace.

== Part 3: Mutations ==
He devotes one section to mistakes that he made, or that editors made when altering his cartoons for one reason or another. These include incomplete drawings, scientific errors (like one featuring polar bears and penguins in the same habitat), typos in the caption, and the right caption set to the wrong cartoon (one time, a Dennis the Menace cartoon featuring children eating sandwiches was inadvertently—or maybe not so inadvertently—set to the Far Side caption, "Oh brother!...Not hamsters again!", while the Far Side cartoon got the Dennis caption—"Lucky thing I learned to make peanut butter sandwiches or we woulda starved to death by now."). In a separate section called "Subtle Things," he discusses the techniques he brings to the cartooning table.

== Part 4: Stimulus–Response ==
Here Larson shows his cartoons that have provoked controversy, even outrage, and he reprints some of the indignant letters of protest. Some of his cartoons are thought to be in bad taste, as one featuring a couple of dogs playing "Tethercat." In such cases, he argues that readers either were oversensitive or misunderstood the cartoon. One time, a representative of the Jane Goodall Institute attacked a Far Side cartoon in which two chimpanzees are grooming when one finds a human hair and asks, "Conducting a little more 'research' with that Jane Goodall tramp?" Larson was ready to apologize to Goodall, until it came out that Goodall loved the cartoon and had no idea someone in her organization had complained.

A few of his cartoons were controversial simply because they were hard to understand. A particular example was "Cow Tools," which depicts a cow standing by a table on which rest four oddly shaped objects. Larson had found it funny that cows would be really bad at toolmaking. His mistake was making one of the tools resemble a saw, as it led people to believe they had to identify the other tools to understand some kind of deeper meaning. "'Off days' are a part of life," he writes, "whether you're a cartoonist, a neurosurgeon, or an air-traffic controller."

Larson also reprints a letter from an entomologist proposing to name a newly discovered species of chewing lice after Larson, Strigiphilus garylarsoni. The scientist explains that he did this "to honor the enormous contribution that my colleagues and I feel you have made to biology through your cartoons." The image of this insect also appears in the form of a geometric design on the inside front and back covers.

The next section shows a handful of cartoons that his editors rejected (or, in a few cases, that he never even bothered submitting), usually because they were considered in poor taste. Larson responds to everyone who's taken the trouble to complain, with a large print of a boy making a face.

== Part 5: The Exhibit ==
Larson presents a gallery of his own personal favorite Far Side cartoons. "I contemplated making this last section a collection of what I consider the lousiest cartoons I've ever drawn, but space was limited."
