= Alice Auersperg =

Austrian cognitive biologist

- Education: University of Vienna
- Known for: Evolution of intelligence in birds, physical cognition, play behavior, problem-solving, tool-making abilities in parrots and corvids
- Awards: FWF START award 2020, 2021 Science Award in the field of Medical Science, Science Prize of the State of Lower Austria, Kardinal Innitzer Promotion Prize
- Scientific career
- Fields: Cognitive biology, Ornithology, Evolutionary biology
- Workplaces: Messerli Research Institute, University of Veterinary Medicine Vienna

Alice Auersperg (b. 1981) is an Austrian cognitive biologist specializing in the evolution of intelligence in birds. Her research is focused on the physical cognition, play behavior, problem-solving and tool-making abilities in parrots and corvids. Since 2011, she has been managing the Goffin Lab of Comparative Cognition at the Messerli Research Institute of the University of Veterinary Medicine Vienna in Austria, where she has extensively studied the intelligence of the Tanimbar corella, also known as Goffin's cockatoo.

Auersperg is a daughter of Luitpold Prinz von Bayern, and married to Lukas Auersperg (b. 1981). She graduated from the University of Vienna in 2011. She wrote her thesis on the spatial awareness of kea (Nestor notabilis). She has also published research on the abilities of corvids, parrots, and orangutans to create tools in order to solve problems and complete tasks.

In 2021, she was awarded both the Science Prize of the State of Lower Austria and the Kardinal Innitzer Promotion Prize.

Auersperg and Patricia McAllister-Käfer co-authored Der Erfindergeist der Tiere (English: "The Inventiveness of Animals"), which was published in February 2025.

After her book was published, she was contacted by owners of other animals who were using various tools in innovative ways. One owner had a pet cow, Veronika, who used a pole held in her mouth to scratch her back. Auersperg discovered that the animal was using the pole as an example of "flexible tool use" by wielding the stick, then both ends of a broom, to scratch different parts of her body that were itching from insect bites. Flexible tool use is relatively rare among animals.

== See also ==
- Behavioral ecology
- Irene Pepperberg
- Tool use by animals
- Ornithology
