= Cow tools =

1982 The Far Side cartoon

The "cow tools" cartoon

"Cow tools" is a cartoon from The Far Side by American cartoonist Gary Larson, published on October 28, 1982. It depicts a cow standing behind a table of bizarre, misshapen implements with the caption "Cow tools". The cartoon confused many readers, who wrote or phoned in seeking an explanation of the joke. In response, Larson issued a press release clarifying that the thrust of the cartoon was simply that, if a cow were to make tools, they would "lack something in sophistication". It has been described as "arguably the most loathed Far Side strip ever" while also becoming a popular internet meme.

== Description ==
"Cow tools" is a single-panel black-and-white cartoon depicting a cow standing on its hind legs at a table, with a barn in the background. On the table are four oddly shaped objects: one resembles a crude hand saw, while the others are more abstract. The caption beneath the cartoon simply reads "Cow tools".

== Reactions ==
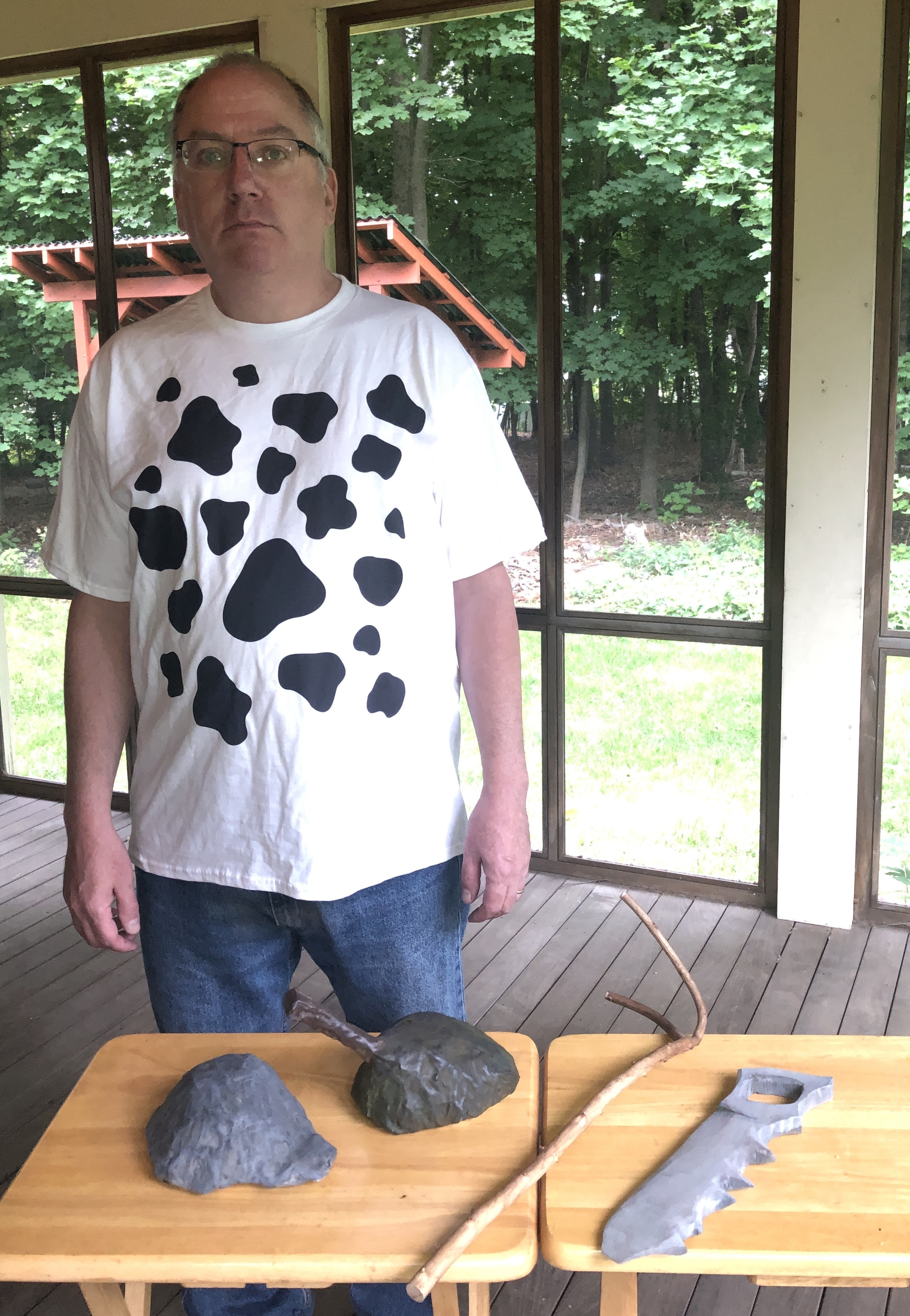
A real-life recreation of "Cow Tools" shared on social media. The cartoon's anti-humor has made it a popular subject for Internet memes.

Immediately upon the cartoon's publication, Chronicle Features, which syndicated The Far Side, was inundated with queries from readers and newspaper editors seeking an explanation of the cartoon. According to the general manager of Chronicle Features, "the phone never stopped ringing for two days." Larson himself received hundreds of letters about "Cow Tools", some of which were reprinted in the 1989 anthology The Prehistory of The Far Side. In one letter, a reader from Texas wrote that they had shown the cartoon to "40-odd professionals with doctoral degrees", and none could understand it.

Reflecting on the cartoon's reception, Larson suggested he had erred in making one of the tools resemble a crude saw, which misled many readers into believing that to understand the cartoon's message, they needed to decipher the identities of the other three tools.

Several decades after its release, the cartoon became a popular Internet meme, with the drawing of the tools from the cartoon being edited into other images.

== Explanation ==
Larson took the unusual step of issuing a press release, explaining the joke:

The cartoon was intended to be an exercise in silliness. While I have never met a cow who could make tools, I felt sure that if I did, they (the tools) would lack something in sophistication and resemble the sorry specimens shown in this cartoon. I regret that my fondness for cows, combined with an overactive imagination, may have carried me beyond what is comprehensible to the average Far Side reader.

Years later, in The Prehistory of the Far Side, Larson further explained that he was inspired by the fact that some non-human primates and birds also used tools; he imagined that if cows were also discovered to be a tool-using species, their creations would be fairly crude.

== Example in real life ==
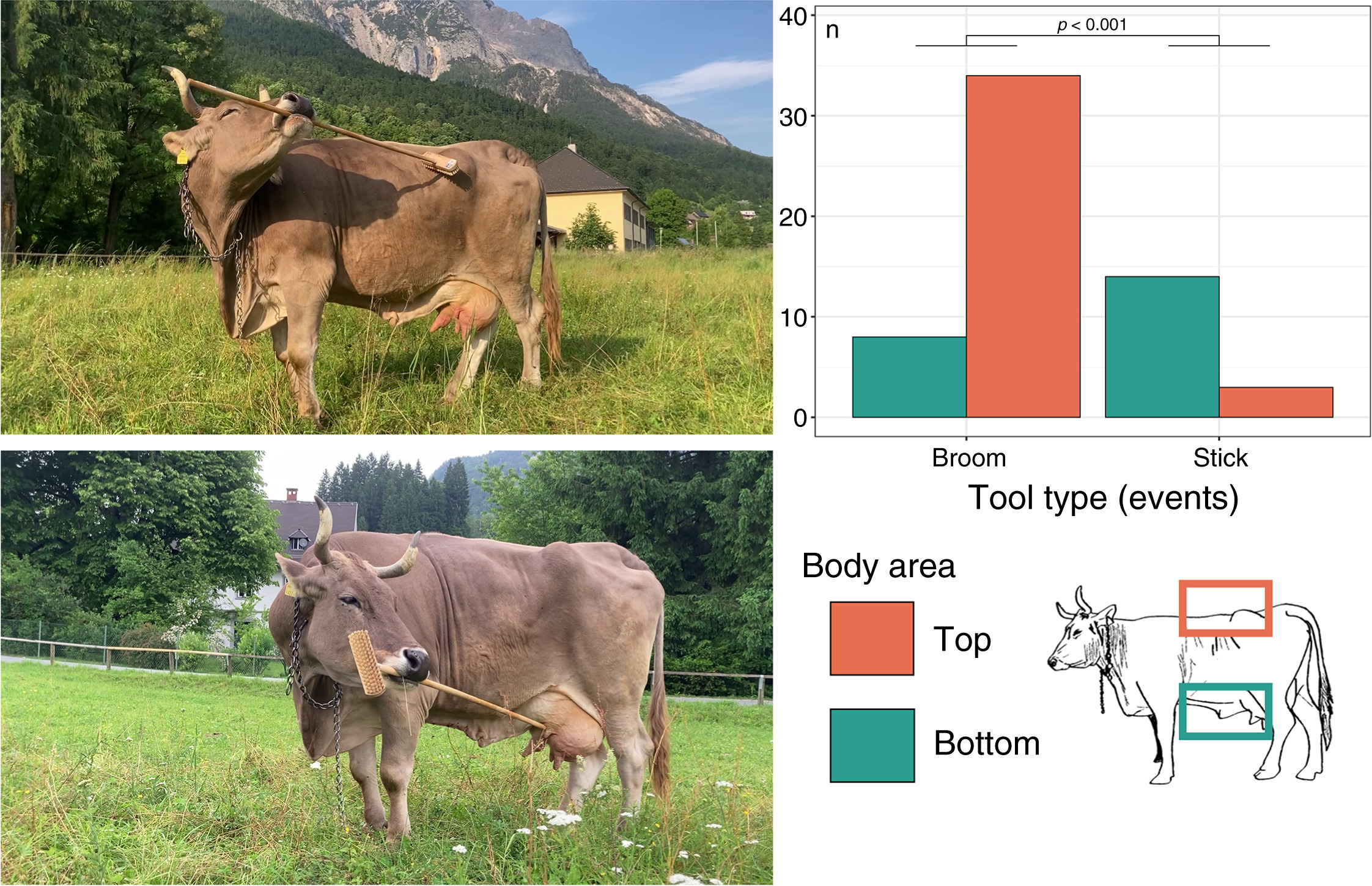
Veronika, a Swiss Brown (Braunvieh) cow, uses a broom to scratch herself, using the coarse brush on her tough hide and the wooden handle on her udders and underbelly.

In early 2026, the first scientific report of tool use in cows was published in Current Biology. The paper, which references the Far Side cartoon, describes a pet cow named Veronika that scratched herself with a stick or wooden broom, using different ends to scratch parts of her body that she could not otherwise reach—a rare example of flexible multi-purpose tool use by non-humans.

The research suggests a previously unknown sophistication in livestock intelligence, which the deprived environments of industrial farms may typically hinder. The authors note that Veronika "did not fashion tools like the cow in Gary Larson's cartoon, but she selected, adjusted, and used one with notable dexterity and flexibility". The paper concludes: "Perhaps the real absurdity lies not in imagining a tool-using cow, but in assuming such a thing could never exist."

== See also ==
- Tool use by non-human animals
