= Nature's Way =

American comic strip by Gary Larson

- Author(s): Gary Larson
- Current status/schedule: Ended
- Launch date: 1976
- End date: 1980
- Syndicate(s): Pacific Search (1976); Sumner News Review (1976–1979); The Seattle Times (1979–1980)
- Genre(s): Humor, Satire

Nature's Way is an American newspaper cartoon series by Gary Larson published in 1976. It launched his career in cartooning and eventually led to his popular The Far Side series in 1980.

== History ==
Nature's Way began as six comic strips submitted in 1976 to the Pacific Search, a local magazine in Seattle. This was Larson's effort to get away from a retail music store job. He was paid $90 for the strips, which encouraged him to produce more cartoons. He soon began submitting weekly cartoons to a newspaper, The Sumner News-Review, which paid him $3 a cartoon. With such earnings, his enthusiasm began to wane, and he began to revert to his previous situation as a non-cartoonist and worked for the Humane Society.

In 1979, a reporter to whom he had shown his work got him published in The Seattle Times. It was published on a weekly basis with a payment of $15 per cartoon. Because they chose to position it right next to a children's crossword puzzle, it began to draw complaints. These were enough to get the strip canceled in 1980, just a few days after Larson got a contract with the San Francisco Chronicle, which jump-started his career.

Eventually, the name was changed to The Far Side. In The Prehistory of the Far Side, Larson commented, "They could have called it Revenge of the Zucchini People for all I cared" as he was so happy to be eagerly accepted into the San Francisco Chronicle.

== Cartoon style ==
=== Artistic ===
The artistic style of this strip had some similarities to The Far Side. For instance, the people in the strips were often overweight. The facial structures in Nature's Way also tended to resemble those found in Far Side cartoons, as well as having the same one-panel structure as The Far Side.

=== Humor ===
The humor in Nature's Way was often based on ironic settings, bizarre mistakes, plays on common phrases, anthropomorphic situations and general oddities of nature.
