= Tool use by non-human animals =

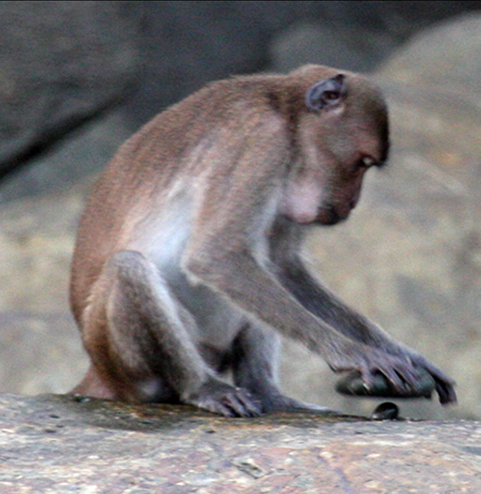
A crab-eating macaque using a stone

A wide range of non-human animals, including mammals, birds, fish, cephalopods and insects, use tools in order to achieve a goal, such as acquiring food and water, grooming, combat, defence, communication, recreation, or construction. Some tool use requires a sophisticated level of cognition. There is considerable discussion about the definition of what constitutes a tool and therefore which behaviours can be considered to be tool use. The fashioning of tools is much rarer than the use of existing objects as tools, and is only attested from mammals and birds.

Primates are well known for using tools for hunting or gathering food and water, cover for rain, and self-defence. Chimpanzees have often been the object of study in regard to their usage of tools, most famously by Jane Goodall, since these animals are frequently kept in captivity and are closely related to humans. Wild tool use in other primates, especially among apes and monkeys, is considered relatively common, though its full extent remains poorly documented, as many primates in the wild are mainly only observed distantly or briefly when in their natural environments and living without human influence. Some novel tool-use by primates may arise in a localised or isolated manner within certain unique primate cultures, being transmitted and practised among socially connected primates through cultural learning. Many famous researchers, such as Charles Darwin in his 1871 book The Descent of Man, have mentioned tool use in monkeys (such as baboons).

Among other mammals, both wild and captive elephants are known to create tools using their trunks and feet, mainly for swatting flies, scratching, plugging up waterholes that they have dug (to close them up again so the water does not evaporate), and reaching food that is out of reach. In addition to primates and elephants, many other social mammals particularly have been observed engaging in tool use. A group of dolphins in Shark Bay uses sea sponges to protect their beaks while foraging. Sea otters will use rocks or other hard objects to dislodge food (such as abalone) and break open shellfish. Several mammals of the order Carnivora have been observed using tools, often to trap prey or break open the shells of prey, as well as for scratching and problem-solving.

Corvids (such as crows, ravens and rooks) are well known for their large brains (among birds) and tool use. New Caledonian crows are among the only animals that create their own tools. They mainly manufacture probes out of twigs and wood (and sometimes metal wire) to catch or impale larvae. Tool use in some birds may be best exemplified in nest intricacy. Tailorbirds manufacture 'pouches' to make their nests in. Some birds, such as weaver birds, build complex nests utilising a diverse array of objects and materials, many of which are specifically chosen by certain birds for their unique qualities. Woodpecker finches insert twigs into trees in order to catch or impale larvae. Parrots may use tools to wedge nuts so that they can crack open the outer shell of nuts without launching away the inner contents. Some birds take advantage of human activity, such as carrion crows in Japan, which drop nuts in front of cars to crack them open.

Several species of fish use tools to hunt and crack open shellfish, extract food that is out of reach, or clear an area for nesting. Among cephalopods (and perhaps uniquely or to an extent unobserved among invertebrates), octopuses are known to utilise tools relatively frequently, such as gathering coconut shells to create a shelter or using rocks to create barriers.

== Definitions and terminology ==
The key to identifying tool use is defining what constitutes a tool. Researchers of animal behaviour have arrived at different formulations.

In 1981, Beck published a widely used definition of tool use. This has been modified to:

The external employment of an unattached or manipulable attached environmental object to alter more efficiently the form, position, or condition of another object, another organism, or the user itself, when the user holds and directly manipulates the tool during or prior to use and is responsible for the proper and effective orientation of the tool.

Other, briefer definitions have been proposed:

An object carried or maintained for future use.

— Finn, Tregenza, and Norman, 2009.

The use of physical objects other than the animal's own body or appendages as a means to extend the physical influence realised by the animal.

— Jones and Kamil, 1973

An object that has been modified to fit a purpose ... [or] An inanimate object that one uses or modifies in some way to cause a change in the environment, thereby facilitating one's achievement of a target goal.

— Hauser, 2000

Others, for example Lawick-Goodall, distinguish between "tool use" and "object use".

Different terms have been given to the tool according to whether the tool is altered by the animal. If the "tool" is not held or manipulated by the animal in any way, such as an immobile anvil, objects in a bowerbird's bower, or a bird using bread as bait to catch fish, it is sometimes referred to as a "proto-tool".

When an animal uses a tool that acts on another tool, this has been termed use of a "meta-tool". For example, New Caledonian crows will spontaneously use a short tool to obtain an otherwise inaccessible longer tool that then allows them to extract food from a hole. Similarly, bearded capuchin monkeys will use smaller stones to loosen bigger quartz pebbles embedded in conglomerate rock, which they subsequently use as tools.

Rarely, animals may use one tool followed by another, for example, bearded capuchins use stones and sticks, or two stones. This is called "associative", "secondary" or "sequential" tool use.

Some animals use other individuals in a way which could be interpreted as tool use, for example, ants crossing water over a bridge of other ants, or weaver ants using conspecifics to glue leaves together. These have been termed "social tools".

=== Borderline examples ===
==== Play ====
Play has been defined as "activity having no immediate benefits and structurally including repetitive or exaggerated actions that may be out of sequence or disordered". When play is discussed in relation to manipulating objects, it is often used in association with the word "tool". Some birds, notably crows, parrots and birds of prey, "play" with objects, many of them playing in flight with such items as stones, sticks and leaves, by letting them go and catching them again before they reach the ground. A few species repeatedly drop stones, apparently for the enjoyment of the sound effects. Many other species of animals, both avian and non-avian, play with objects in a similar manner.

==== Fixed "devices" ====
The impaling of prey on thorns by many of the shrikes (Laniidae) is well known. Several other birds may use spines or forked sticks to anchor a carcass while they flay it with the bill. It has been concluded that "This is an example of a fixed device which serves as an extension of the body, in this case, talons" and is thus a true form of tool use. On the other hand, the use of fixed skewers may not be true tool-use because the thorn (or other pointed objects) is not manipulated by the bird. Leopards perform a similar behaviour by dragging carcasses up trees and caching them in the forks of branches.

==== Use of bait ====
Several species of bird, including herons such as the striated heron (Butorides striatus), will place bread in water to attract fish. Whether this is tool use is disputed because the bread is not manipulated or held by the bird.

Captive orcas have been observed baiting and catching a bird with a regurgitated fish, as well as showing similar behaviour in the wild.

=== Learning and cognition ===
Tool use by animals may indicate different levels of learning and cognition. For some animals, tool use is largely instinctive and inflexible. For example, the woodpecker finch of the Galápagos Islands use twigs or spines as an essential and regular part of its foraging behaviour, but these behaviours are often quite inflexible and are not applied effectively in different situations. The mechanisms driving other tool use, e.g. chimpanzee tool-use, are still debated. Whilst some may argue that behaviours such as using twigs to "fish" for termites, may be developed by watching others use tools and may even be a true example of animal teaching, studies with captive chimpanzees have found that many of these species-typical behaviours (including termite fishing) are individually learnt by each chimpanzee. Tools may even be used in solving puzzles in which the animal appears to experience a "Eureka moment".

== In mammals ==
=== Primates ===
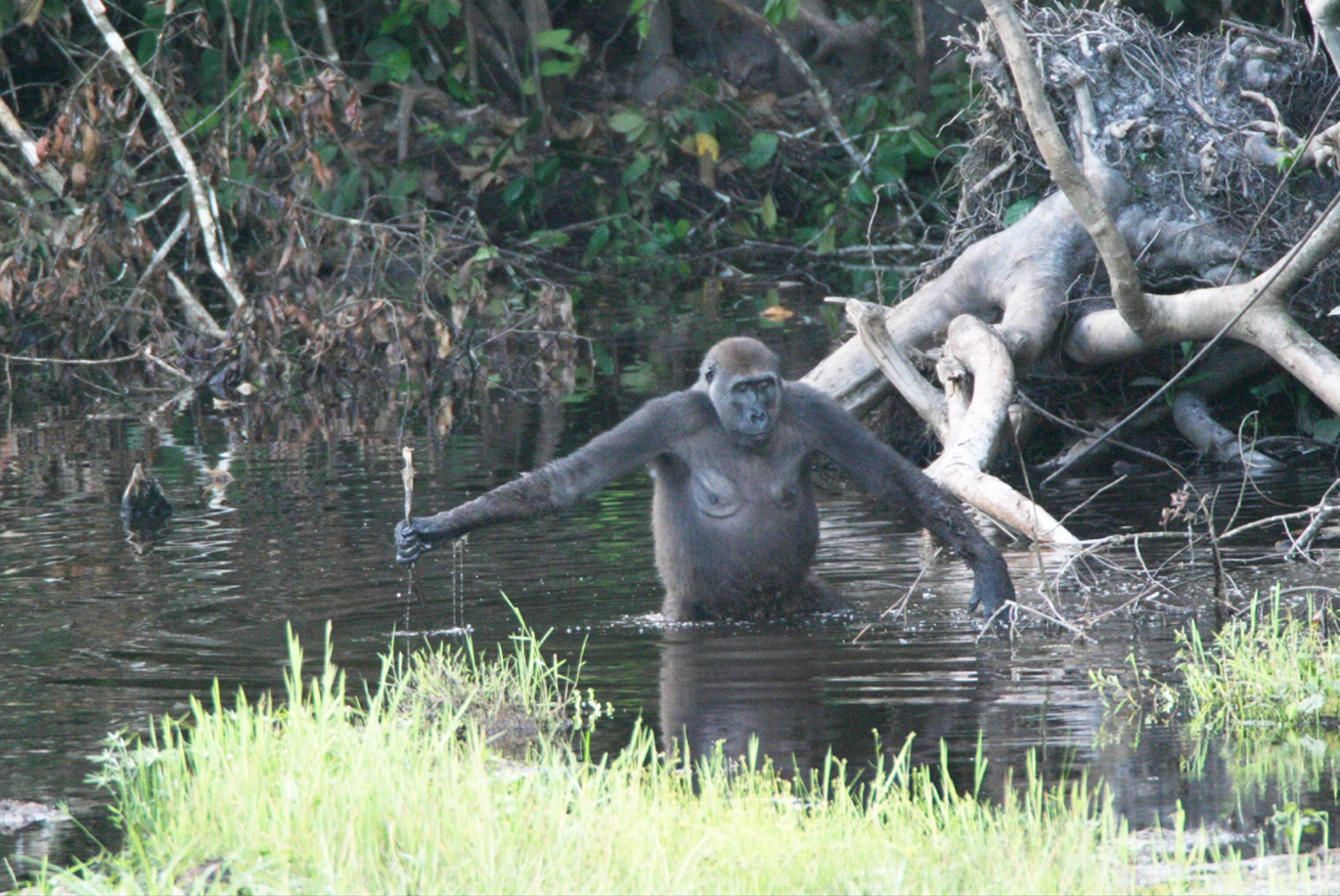
A western lowland gorilla, G. g. gorilla, using a stick to gauge the depth of water

Tool use has been reported many times in both wild and captive primates, particularly the great apes. The use of tools by primates is varied and includes hunting (mammals, invertebrates, fish), collecting honey, processing food (nuts, fruits, vegetables and seeds), collecting water, weapons and shelter. Tool manufacture is much rarer than simple tool use and probably represents higher cognitive functioning. Soon after her initial discovery of tool use, Goodall observed other chimpanzees picking up leafy twigs, stripping off the leaves and using the stems to fish for insects. This change of a leafy twig into a tool was a major discovery. Prior to this, scientists thought that only humans manufactured and used tools, and that this ability was what separated humans from other animals. In 1990, it was claimed the only primate to manufacture tools in the wild was the chimpanzee. However, since then, several primates have been reported as tool makers in the wild.

=== Elephants ===
Elephants show an ability to manufacture and use tools with their trunk and feet. Both wild and captive Asian elephants (Elephas maximus) use branches to swat flies or scratch themselves. Eight of 13 captive Asian elephants, maintained under a naturalistic environment, modified branches and switched with the altered branch, indicating this species is capable of the more rare behaviour of tool manufacture. There were different styles of modification of the branches, the most common of which was holding the main stem with the front foot and pulling off a side branch or distal end with the trunk. Elephants have been observed digging holes to drink water, then ripping bark from a tree, chewing it into the shape of a ball thereby manufacturing a "plug" to fill in the hole, and covering it with sand to avoid evaporation. They would later go back to the spot to drink.

Asian elephants may use tools in insightful problem solving. A captive male was observed moving a box to a position where it could be stood upon to reach food that had been deliberately hung out of reach.

Elephants have also been known to drop large rocks onto an electric fence to either ruin the fence or cut off the electricity.

=== Cetaceans ===
Researchers pushed a pole with a conical sponge attached along the substrate to simulate sponging behaviour by dolphins. They videotaped this experiment to learn what prey was available on the seafloor and why a sponge would be beneficial to foraging rather than echolocation.

A community of Indo-Pacific bottlenose dolphins (Tursiops sp.) in Shark Bay, Western Australia, made up of approximately 41-54 animals, are known to use conical sponges (Echinodictyum mesenterinum) as tools while foraging. This behaviour, termed "sponging", occurs when a dolphin breaks off a sponge and wears it over its rostrum while foraging on the seafloor. Sponging behaviour typically begins in the second year of life. During sponging, dolphins mainly target fish that lack swim bladders and burrow in the substrate. Therefore, the sponge may be used to protect their rostrums as they forage in a niche where echolocation and vision are less effective hunting techniques. Dolphins tend to carry the same sponge for multiple surfacings but sometimes change sponges. Spongers typically are more solitary, take deeper dives, and spend more time foraging than non-spongers. Despite these costs, spongers have similar calving success to non-spongers.

There is evidence that both ecological and cultural factors predict which dolphins use sponges as tools. Sponging occurs more frequently in areas with higher distribution of sponges, which tends to occur in deeper water channels. Sponging is heavily sex-biased to females. Genetic analyses suggest that all spongers are descendants of a single matriline, suggesting cultural transmission of the use of sponges as tools. Sponging may be socially learned from mother to offspring. Social grouping behaviour suggests homophily (the tendency to associate with similar others) among dolphins that share socially learned skills such as sponge tool use. Sponging has only been observed in Shark Bay.

Indo-Pacific bottlenose dolphins in Shark Bay have also been observed carrying conch shells. In this behaviour, dolphins insert their rostrum into the shell's aperture. Although this behaviour is rare, it appears to be used for foraging. Dolphins appear to use the conch shells to scoop fish from the substrate then carry the shell to retrieve the fish near the surface.

=== Carnivorans ===
==== Sea otters ====
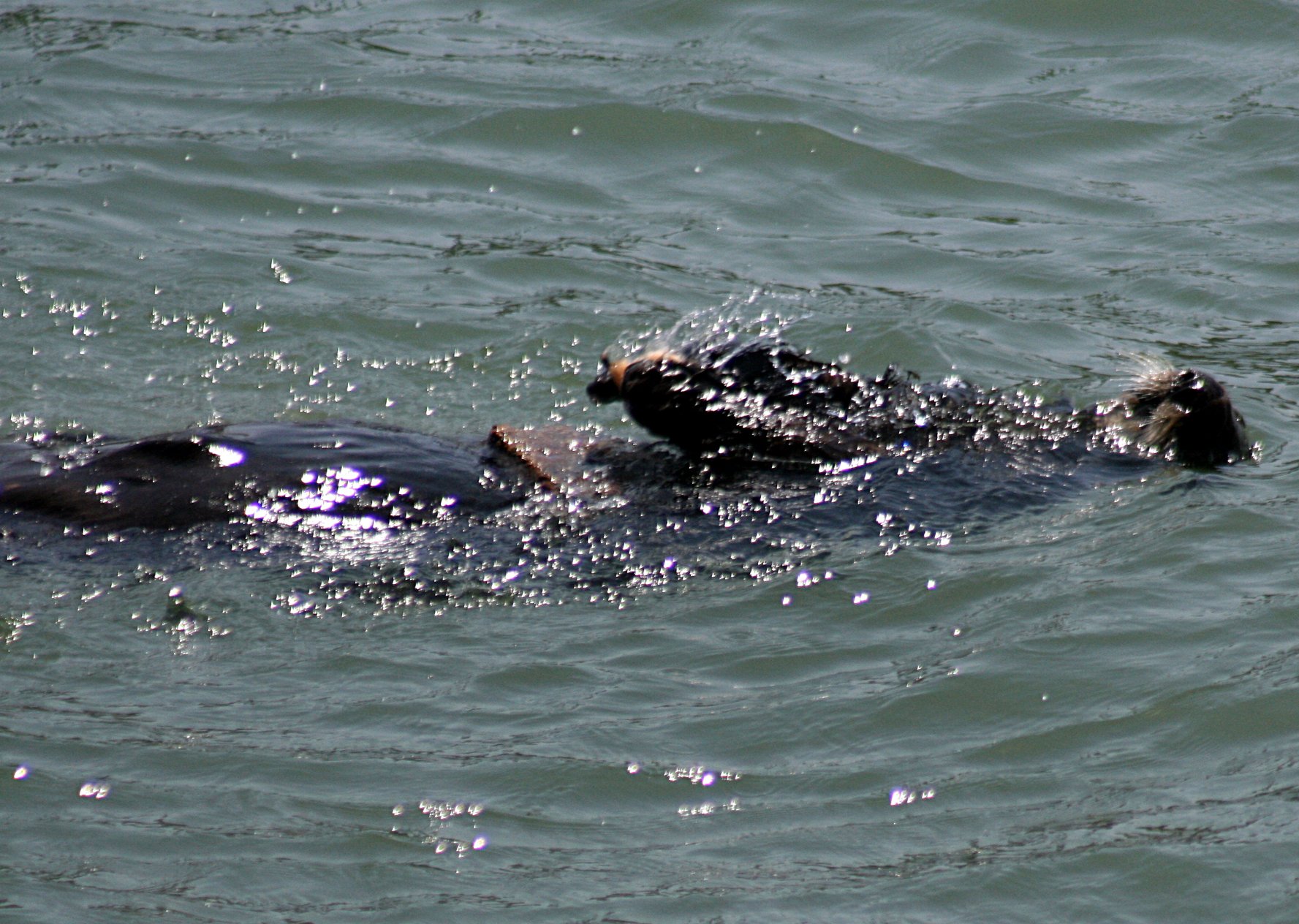
A sea otter using a rock to break open a shell

Under each foreleg, the sea otter (Enhydra lutris) has a loose pouch of skin that extends across the chest. In this pouch (preferentially the left side), the animal stores collected food to bring to the surface. Otters are also known to keep rocks in this "pocket" that they use to crack open clams and shellfish. To open hard shells, it may pound its prey with both paws against the rock which it places on its chest. Furthermore, sea otters will use large stones to pry an abalone off its rock; they will hammer the abalone shell with observed rates of 45 blows in 15 seconds or 180 rpm, and do it in two or three dives. Releasing an abalone, which can cling to rock with a force equal to 4,000 times its own body weight, requires multiple dives by the otter.

Although sea otter tool use is most associated with their use of stones as anvils and hammers, they have been observed using a wide array of other objects as tools, including empty shells, driftwood, and discarded cans or bottles. Sea otters also use kelp or seaweed as an anchor to buoy themselves or to immobilise prey such as crabs. Some sea otters will even improvise techniques, such as ripping off the claws of crabs and using them to pry open the crab's own shell.

Sea otters have demonstrated the capacity for social learning, with knowledge passed down both vertically from mother to pup and horizontally within groups. The frequency of tool use varies greatly between geographic regions and individual otters and depends heavily on maternal transmission.

Sea otters are one of only three species, along with humans and bottlenose dolphins, among which individual-level specialisation in tool use is documented. Genomic analyses indicate that the RELN gene, which encodes the reelin protein and modulates synaptic plasticity and long-term potentiation, has been under positive selection among both bottlenose dolphins and sea otters, but not among river otters. The authors suggest that the maternally and socially transmitted variation in foraging behaviour and tool use displayed by both sea otters and bottlenose dolphins might be linked to genetic adaptations for increased memory and learning abilities.

==== Other carnivores ====
Wild banded mongooses (Mungos mungo) regularly use anvils to open food items with a hard shell such as rhinoceros beetles, bird eggs, snail shells or pupating dung beetles. They use a range of anvils commonly including rocks and the stems of trees, but will also use the side-walls of gullys and even dried elephant dung. Pups as young as 2 months of age begin showing the behavioural patterns associated with using an anvil, however, successful smashing is usually shown in individuals older than 6 months of age.

Honey badgers both wild and captive have been filmed manipulating various objects to assist them in making climbs, including making mud balls and stacking them. In 2014, a South African honey badger named Stoffel repeatedly escaped his enclosure to attack the next door lions. Stoffel went so far as to build a ramp to get over the wall.

North American badgers (Taxidea taxus) hunt Richardson's ground squirrels (Spermophilus richardsonii). The most common hunting technique is excavation of burrow systems, but plugging of openings into ground-squirrel tunnels accounts for 5–23% of hunting actions. Badgers usually use soil from around the tunnel opening, or soil dragged 30–270 cm from a nearby mound to plug tunnels. The least common (6%), but most novel, form of plugging used by one badger involved movement of 37 objects from distances of 20–105 cm to plug openings into 23 ground-squirrel tunnels on 14 nights.

In 2011, researchers at the Dingo Discovery and Research Centre in Melbourne, Australia, filmed a dingo manipulating a table and using this to get food.

Domestic dogs have been observed using and even making tools, whether using human-made and provided objects, or making them with their jaws; one account from 1973 had one dog named Grendel making a back scratcher out of a sheep bone.

Molting brown bears in Alaska, USA, have been observed using rocks to exfoliate. There is also evidence that polar bears throw rocks and big pieces of ice at walruses to kill them.

Captive studies have demonstrated that raccoons can use inanimate objects, such as rocks, to manipulate their environment, obtain food, and make toys, showing a capacity for tool use.

A 2025 field report in British Columbia, Canada, documented a wolf pulling a crab trap's buoy and line to bring the submerged trap to shore and access its bait cup, which the authors described as potential tool use and as suggesting "a sophisticated understanding of the multi-step connection between the floating buoy and the bait within the out-of-sight trap." They noted that whether the behaviour qualifies as tool use depends on the definition, and that similar damage and a second instance involving a partially submerged trap were recorded, though the origin and prevalence of the behaviour remain unknown.

=== Ungulates ===
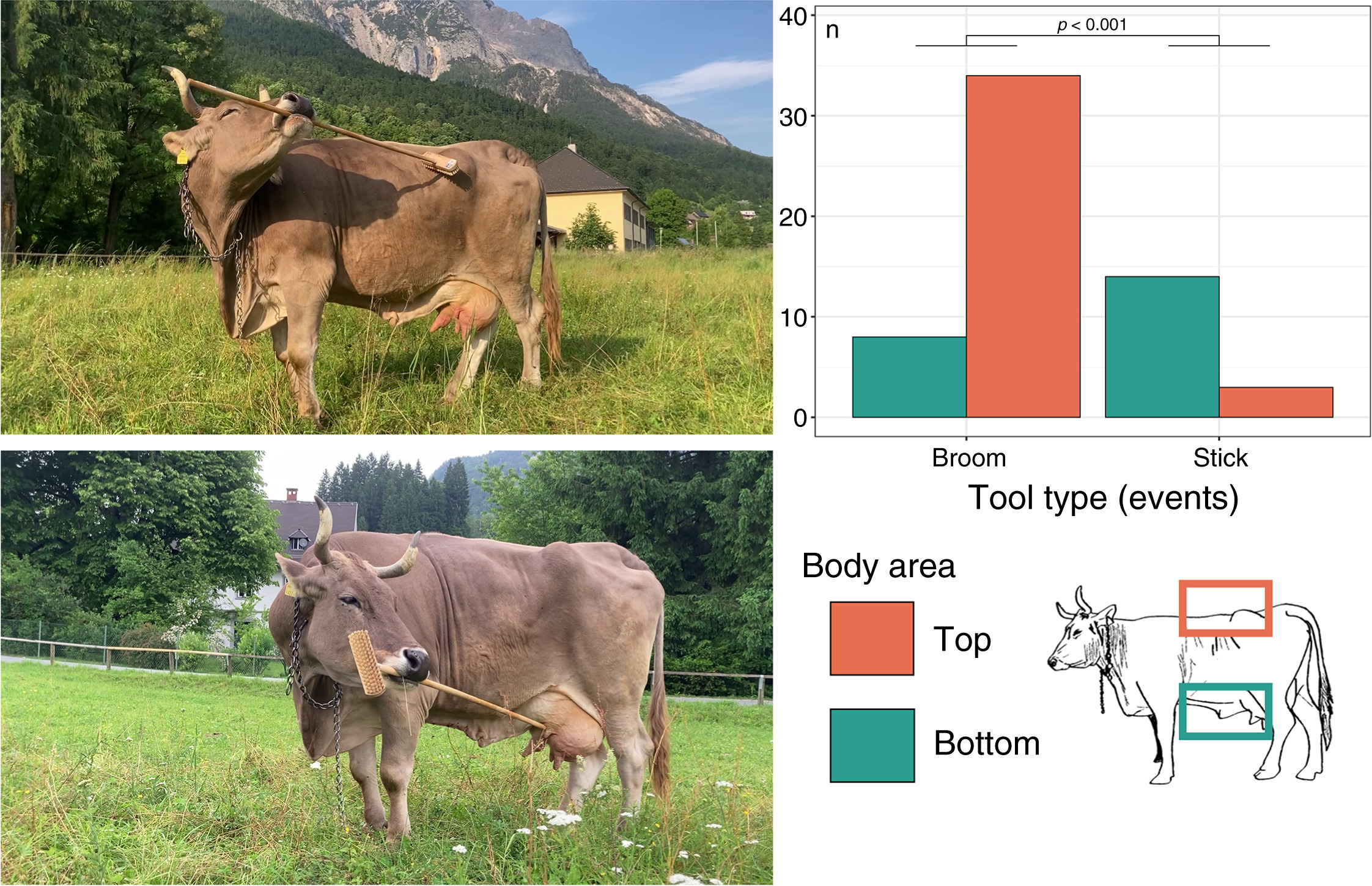
Veronika, a Swiss Brown (Braunvieh) cow, using a broom to scratch itches. She flexibly uses the coarse brush on the tougher hide on her top and sides, but treats her underbelly with the smooth stick end.

- A family of captive Visayan warty pigs at Ménagerie du Jardin des plantes have been observed using a flat piece of bark as a digging tool.
- Horses have also been observed using different tools.
- Among cattle, a cow named Veronika was observed by scientists to intelligently operate a multi-use tool. She was documented choosing the bristle end of a broom to scratch her sides and back, and the smooth stick end of the broom to scratch more sensitive parts of her body, such as her udders.

== In reptiles ==
A 2013 paper suggested that American alligators and mugger crocodiles living near bird rookeries used twigs and sticks as bait to catch nesting birds. However, a 2019 study found no support that alligators were displaying sticks as lures, or that the predator was taking the seasonal behaviour of the birds into account, as was suggested in the original paper.

== In birds ==
Tool use is found in at least thirty-three different families of birds. Trinidad Motmots crack the shells and exoskeletons of snails and arthropods by striking them against stones on the forest floor, utilizing these stones as anvils. This is considered borderline tool use. According to Jones and Kamil's definition, this, or a bearded vulture dropping a bone on a rock would not be considered using a tool since the rock cannot be seen as an extension of the body. However, the use of a rock manipulated using the beak to crack an ostrich egg would qualify the Egyptian vulture as a tool user. Many other species, including parrots, corvids and a range of passerines, have been noted as tool users.

Bird nests show a great diversity in complexity, including intricate tree and ground nests.

Many birds (and other animals) build nests. It can be argued that this behaviour constitutes tool use according to the definitions given above; the birds "carry objects (twigs, leaves) for future use", the shape of the formed nest prevents the eggs from rolling away and thereby "extends the physical influence realised by the animal", and the twigs are bent and twisted to shape the nest, i.e. "modified to fit a purpose". The complexity of bird nests varies markedly, perhaps indicating a range in the sophistication of tool use. For example, compare the highly complex structures of weaver birds to the simple mats of herbaceous matter with a central cup constructed by gulls, and it is noteworthy that some birds do not build nests, e.g. emperor penguins. The classification of nests as tools has been disputed on the basis that the completed nest, or burrow, is not held or manipulated.

Prey-dropping behaviour is seen in many species of birds. Species of crows such as Carrion, Northwestern, American, and New Caledonian crows exhibit this behaviour using different prey. Gulls, particularly Kelp, Western, Black-Headed and Sooty gulls are also known to drop mussels from a height as a foraging adaptation. This behaviour is demonstrated by dropping prey from a height onto a hard substrate in order to break the prey's shell open. Several variables such as prey size, substrate type, kleptoparasitism, etc. can influence the behaviour of prey dropping in various species.

=== Galapagos finches ===
Perhaps the best known and most studied example of an avian tool user is the woodpecker finch (Camarhynchus pallidus) from the Galápagos Islands. If the bird uncovers prey in bark which is inaccessible, the bird then flies off to fetch a cactus spine which it may use in one of three different ways: as a goad to drive out an active insect (without necessarily touching it); as a spear with which to impale a slow-moving larva or similar animal; or as an implement with which to push, bring towards, nudge or otherwise manoeuvre an inactive insect from a crevice or hole. Tools that do not exactly fit the purpose are worked by the bird and adapted for the function, thus making the finch a "tool maker" as well as a "tool user". Some individuals have been observed to use a different type of tool with novel functional features such as barbed twigs from blackberry bushes, a plant that is not native to the islands. The twigs were first modified by removing side twigs and leaves and then used such that the barbs helped drag prey out of tree crevices.

There is a genetic predisposition for tool use in this species, which is then refined by individual trial-and-error learning during a sensitive phase early in development. This means that, rather than following a stereotypical behavioural pattern, tool use can be modified and adapted by learning.

The importance of tool use by woodpecker finch species differs between vegetation zones. In the arid zone, where food is limited and hard to access, tool use is essential, especially during the dry season. Up to half of the finches' prey is acquired with the help of tools, making them even more routine tool users than chimpanzees. The tools allow them to extract large, nutritious insect larvae from tree holes, making tool use more profitable than other foraging techniques. In contrast, in the humid zone, woodpecker finches rarely use tools, since food availability is high and prey is more easily obtainable. Here, the time and energy costs of tool use would be too high.

There have been reported cases of woodpecker finches brandishing a twig as a weapon.

=== Corvids ===
A New Caledonian crow showing sequential tool use in the laboratory

Corvids are a family of birds characterised by relatively large brains, remarkable behavioural plasticity (especially highly innovative foraging behaviour) and well-developed cognitive abilities.

==== Carrion crows ====
Carrion crows were observed on Eden estuary in Scotland between February and March 1988 to investigate their dropping strategies with mussels. Carrion crows selected larger mussels and dropped them from a height of ≈8m onto hard substrate. The height of mussels dropped were lower than what researchers expected, which may be due to difficulty locating prey post dropping as well as trying to prevent kleptoparasitism (stealing of food by other scavengers). Behaviour of prey dropping seen in carrion crows suggest that the size of prey, substrate surfaces, and height drop influence their behaviour. Therefore, it can be inferred that other species may exhibit different behaviour strategies based on their prey, and environment.

==== Northwestern crows ====
Different variables such as, prey size, shell breakability, predators, substrate, and height affect the behaviour of prey dropping for different species. For instance, selection of prey may depend on substrate used in that environment. Northwestern crows are another example of birds that drop prey from a height onto the ground. Northwestern crows flew vertically up, releasing whelks and immediately diving after it. Similar to the carrion crows, northwestern crows also preferred larger whelks over smaller ones and selected sizes by sight and weight by picking whelks up with their bill. Unlike Carrion crows, Northwestern crows exhibited a unique response upon releasing prey. After releasing whelks, northwestern crows instantly dove after it whereas carrion crows were not as diligent in following and immediately retrieving prey. This behaviour is likely due to northwestern crows minimising and potentially avoiding kleptoparasitism. It is unclear why carrion crows have a different response to prey being released than northwestern crows, however, these differences in behaviour could potentially be due to higher predation in areas that northwestern crows inhabit, or increase in food sources in areas inhabited by carrion crows.

==== American crows ====
American crows are another of several species of birds that possess prey dropping behaviour. When performing the study of prey dropping in American crows, the number of drops to crack a walnut decreased as the height of prey dropped increased and crows had more success when dropping walnuts onto asphalt compared to soil. Prey loss almost always occurred through kleptoparasitism however, there is a lack of evidence that shows kleptoparasitism being directly affected by height of prey dropped.

==== Caledonian crows ====
New Caledonian crows (Corvus moneduloides) are perhaps the most studied corvid with respect to tool-use.

In the wild, they have been observed using sticks as tools to extract insects from tree bark. The birds poke the insects or larvae until they bite the stick in defence and can then be drawn out. This "larva fishing" is very similar to the "termite fishing" practised by chimpanzees. In the wild, they also manufacture tools from twigs, grass stems or similar plant structures, whereas captive individuals have been observed to use a variety of materials, including feathers and garden wire. Stick tools can either be non-hooked—being more or less straight and requiring only little modification—or hooked. Construction of the more complex hooked tools typically involves choosing a forked twig from which parts are removed and the remaining end is sculpted and sharpened. New Caledonian crows also use pandanus tools, made from barbed leaf edges of screw pines (Pandanus spp.) by precise ripping and cutting although the function of the pandanus tools is not understood.

While young birds in the wild normally learn to make stick tools from elders, a laboratory New Caledonian crow named "Betty" was filmed spontaneously improvising a hooked tool from a wire. It was known that this individual had no prior experience as she had been hand-reared. New Caledonian crows have been observed to use an easily available small tool to get a less easily available longer tool, and then use this to get an otherwise inaccessible longer tool to get food that was out of reach of the shorter tools. One bird, "Sam", spent 110 seconds inspecting the apparatus before completing each of the steps without any mistakes. This is an example of sequential tool use, which represents a higher cognitive function compared to many other forms of tool use and is the first time this has been observed in non-trained animals. Tool use has been observed in a non-foraging context, providing the first report of multi-context tool use in birds. Captive New Caledonian crows have used stick tools to make first contact with objects that were novel and hence potentially dangerous, while other individuals have been observed using a tool when food was within reach but placed next to a model snake. It has been claimed "Their [New Caledonian crow] tool-making skills exceed those of chimpanzees and are more similar to human tool manufacture than those of any other animal."

New Caledonian crows have also been observed performing tool use behaviour that had hitherto not been described in non-human animals. The behaviour is termed "insert-and-transport tool use". This involves the crow inserting a stick into an object and then walking or flying away holding both the tool and object on the tool.

New Caledonian crows also demonstrate prey-dropping behaviour. The first recorded evidence of this species of crow demonstrating prey dropping behaviour on the snail Placostylus fibratus in a 2013 study. New Caledonian crows dropped snails from a particular height onto rocky beds and video recording showed one crow repeating this four times from the same height.

==== Hawaiian crow ====
Captive individuals of the critically endangered Hawaiian crow (Corvus hawaiiensis) use tools to extract food from holes drilled in logs. The juveniles exhibit tool use without training or social learning from adults. As 104 of the 109 surviving members of the species were tested, it is believed to be a species-wide ability.

==== Others ====
Other corvid species, such as rooks (Corvus frugilegus), can also make and use tools in the laboratory, showing a degree of sophistication similar to that of New Caledonian crows. While not confirmed to have used tools in the wild, captive blue jays (Cyanocitta cristata) have been observed using strips of newspaper as tools to obtain food.

Various corvids have reached for stones to place in a vessel of water so as to raise the surface level to drink from it or access a floating treat, enacting Aesop's Fable of The Crow and the Pitcher.

A wild American crow (Corvus brachyrhynchos) has been observed to modify and use a piece of wood as a probe. Green jays (Cyanocorax yncas) have been observed using sticks as tools to extract insects from tree bark. Large-billed crows in urban Japan have been filmed using an innovative technique to crack hard-shelled nuts by dropping them onto crosswalks (pedestrian crossings) and letting them be run over and cracked by cars. They then retrieve the cracked nuts when the cars are stopped at the red light. In some towns in the US, crows drop walnuts onto busy streets so that the cars will crack the nuts. Hooded crows (Corvus cornix) use bait to catch fish. Individuals (who may have observed fish being fed bread by humans) will place the bread in the water to attract fish.

Common ravens (Corvus corax) are one of only a few species who make their own toys. They have been observed breaking off twigs to play with socially. A corvid has been filmed sliding repeatedly down a snow-covered roof while balancing on a lid or tray. Another incidence of play in birds has been filmed showing a corvid playing with a table tennis ball in partnership with a dog, a rare example of tool use for the purposes of play. Blue jays, like other corvids, are highly curious and are considered intelligent birds. Young blue jays playfully snatch brightly coloured or reflective objects, such as bottle caps or pieces of aluminium foil, and carry them around until they lose interest.

=== Warblers ===
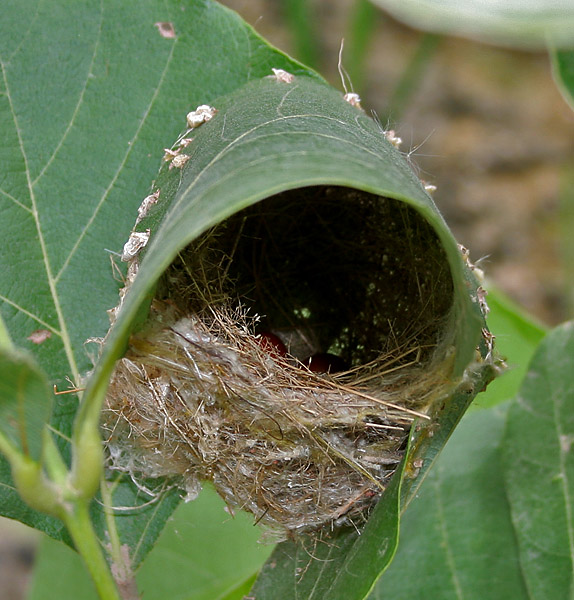
A pouch containing a tailorbird's nest

The tailorbird (genus Orthotomus) takes a large growing leaf (or two or more small ones) and with its sharp bill pierces holes into opposite edges. It then grasps spider silk, silk from cocoons, or plant fibres with its bill, pulls this "thread" through the two holes, and knots it to prevent it from pulling through (although the use of knots is disputed). This process is repeated several times until the leaf or leaves forms a pouch or cup in which the bird then builds its nest. The leaves are sewn together in such a way that the upper surfaces are outwards making the structure difficult to see. The punctures made on the edge of the leaves are minute and do not cause browning of the leaves, further aiding camouflage. The processes used by the tailorbird have been classified as sewing, rivetting, lacing and matting. Once the stitch is made, the fibres fluff out on the outside and in effect they are more like rivets. Sometimes the fibres from one rivet are extended into an adjoining puncture and appear more like sewing. There are many variations in the nest and some may altogether lack the cradle of leaves. The Latin binomial name of the common tailorbird, Orthotomus sutorius, means "straight-edged cobbler" rather than "tailor". Some birds of the genus Prinia also practise this sewing and stitching behaviour.

=== Brown-headed nuthatches ===
Brown-headed nuthatches (Sitta pusilla) have been observed to methodically use bark pieces to remove other flakes of bark from a tree. The birds insert the bark piece underneath an attached bark scale, using it like a wedge and lever, to expose hiding insects. Occasionally, they reuse the same piece of bark several times and sometimes even fly short distances carrying the bark flake in their beak. The evolutionary origin of this tool use might be related to these birds frequently wedging seeds into cracks in the bark to hammer them open with their beak, which can lead to bark coming off.

Brown-headed nuthatches have used a bark flake to conceal a seed cache.

=== Crested lark ===
A crested lark (Galerida cristata) has been photographed apparently holding in its bill a stone chip it was reportedly using to dislodge prey from paving joints.

=== Parrots ===
Kea, a highly inquisitive New Zealand mountain parrot, have been filmed stripping twigs and inserting them into gaps in box-like stoat traps to trigger them. Apparently, the kea's only reward is the banging sound of the trap being set off. In a similarly rare example of tool preparation, a captive Tanimbar corella (Cacatua goffiniana) was observed breaking off and "shaping" splinters of wood and small sticks to create rakes that were then used to retrieve otherwise unavailable food items on the other side of the aviary mesh. This behaviour has been filmed.

Many owners of household parrots have observed their pets using various tools to scratch various parts of their bodies. These tools include discarded feathers, bottle caps, popsicle sticks, matchsticks, cigarette packets and nuts in their shells.

Hyacinth macaws (Anodorhynchus hyacinthinus) have been repeatedly observed to use tools when breaking open nuts, for example, pieces of wood being used as a wedge. Several birds have wrapped a piece of leaf around a nut to hold it in place. This behaviour is also shown by palm cockatoos (Probosciger aterrimus). It seems that the hyacinth macaw has an innate tendency to use tools during manipulation of nuts, as naïve juveniles tried out a variety of objects in combination with nuts.

Tool use behaviour has been observed in the kea, wherein a bird named Bruce, who has a broken upper beak, wedged pebbles between his tongue and lower mandible and then utilised this arrangement to aid with his preening habits.

Tool use behaviour has been observed in the Tanimbar corella in captivity. It was reported in November 2012 by Professor Alice Auersperg of the University of Vienna that a cock bird named Figaro was observed spontaneously shaping splinters of wood and small sticks in order to create rakes that were then utilised to extend his reach and retrieve otherwise unavailable food items located upon the other side of his aviary mesh.

In July 2013, the results of a joint study involving scientists from University of Oxford, the University of Vienna and the Max Planck Institute, again involving the Tanimbar corellas of the Vienna Goffin Lab, were announced. It was discovered that the birds possessed the ability to solve complex mechanical problems, in one case spontaneously working out how to open a five-part locking mechanism in sequence to retrieve a food item. The corellas were able to very quickly adapt their behaviour and again open the lock when the mechanism sections were modified or re-ordered, demonstrating an apparent concept of working towards a particular goal and knowledge of the way in which physical objects act upon each other – rather than merely an ability to repeat a learned sequence of actions.

Further research in 2020 by Auersperg's team compared the problem-solving ability of the captive-bred Goffins at the Goffin Lab with wild birds caught in Tanimbar and exposed to the same experimental conditions – in which the birds were placed in an "innovation arena" and presented a series of 20 different tasks (e.g. pressing a button, turning a wheel, pulling out a drawer, removing a twig, overturning a cup, opening a clip, etc.) which they could choose to partake in, in order to obtain a food reward. It was found that while the wild Goffins were less inclined to interact with the test apparatus, those that did solved the presented tasks at a similar rate to the captive-bred birds.

Wild Goffins were also observed shaping sticks of different dimensions in order to create a series of tools which enabled them to eat sea mango seeds.

=== Egyptian vultures ===
When an Egyptian vulture (Neophron percnopterus) encounters a large egg, it takes a stone into its beak and forcefully throws it at the egg until the shell is broken, usually taking a few minutes. This behaviour, first reported in 1966, seems to be largely innate and is displayed by naïve individuals. Its origin could be related to the throwing of eggs; rounded (egg-like) stones are preferred to jagged ones.

In a small population in Bulgaria, Egyptian vultures use twigs to collect sheep wool for padding their nests. Although both twigs and wool can serve as nesting material, this appears to be deliberate tool use. The birds approached bits of discarded wool with a twig in their beak, which was then either used as a rake, to gather the wool into heaps, or to roll up the wool. Wool was collected only after shearing or simulated shearing of sheep had taken place, but not after wool had simply been deposited in sheep enclosures.

=== Fire-foraging raptors ===
In Australia the black kite (Milvus migrans), whistling kite (Haliastur sphenurus) and unrelated brown falcon (Falco berigora) are not only attracted to wildfires to source food, but will variously use their beaks or talons to carry burning sticks so as to spread fire, complicating human efforts to contain fires using firebreaks.

=== Owls ===
Burrowing owls (Athene cunicularia) frequently collect mammalian dung, which they use as a bait to attract dung beetles, a major item of prey.

=== Gulls ===
Gulls have been known to drop mollusc shells on paved and hard surfaces such as roads. Their dropping habits are similar to corvids in the sense that repeated drops allow gulls to have easier access towards their prey. Certain species (e.g. the herring gull) have exhibited tool use behaviour, using pieces of bread as bait to catch goldfish, for example.

==== Kelp gulls ====
Kelp gulls are one of the well-known gulls that have displayed prey-dropping. These gulls are known to learn their prey-dropping skills by studying other gulls around them, and are able to refine this behaviour to benefit themselves. They commonly break their prey on hard surfaces, such as rocks, asphalt, and even roofs of houses and cars. Kelp gulls normally drop black mussels, and drop-sites are normally chosen based on how well it would break the prey as well as the amount of kleptoparasites that are in the area, as other gulls may take the opportunity to steal an individual's prey. Dropping behaviour occurs at any time of year but is more prevalent in the winter during low-tide hours, most likely due to having more access to larger mussels. Kelp gulls will fly over 0.5 km to a preferred substrate on which to break their prey. Height from which the prey is dropped will increase after each drop of the prey. Once the prey is dropped, a gull will descend as quickly as possible to recover its prey. This is likely to prevent kleptoparasitism, which is very common in prey-dropping. On average, a kelp gull will descend at an average of 4 m/s in comparison to the prey's fall of 5 m/s, which allows the gull to reach the ground about 0.5 seconds after the prey has landed onto the surface. Adult kelp gulls have a higher success rate of breaking and obtaining their prey while prey dropping than juvenile kelp gulls.

==== Western gulls ====
Western gulls are one of the many species of gulls that have been observed to drop their prey on the ground. A study observed that a major factor influencing dropping behaviour in these gulls had to do with the mass and size of the prey being dropped. When performing a study using different sizes of Washington clams, smaller clams were normally pecked at. The larger clams however were dropped unless they were too heavy to carry, usually exceeding 268 grams in weight. Drop behaviour differs between adult and immature western gulls. All adult western gulls that have been studied displayed prey dropping behaviour, and dropped from an average of 118 metres away from where they were originally retrieved. In the study, dropping occurred either over mudflats or a parking lot, which correlated with weight of the clams, which average clam weights were 106.7 g and 134.3 g respectively. Immature gulls meanwhile are much more clumsy with their dropping, and only 55% of juvenile western gulls that were observed displayed this behaviour. Juvenile gulls also did not seem to have a correlation between the weight of the clam and the height the clam was dropped at, though it is noted that the younger gulls seemed to drop their prey at much lower heights than their older peers. This could be evidence of juvenile gulls learning this behaviour through trial and error. The low height at which the clams are dropped may also result in the number of times the younger gulls had to drop their prey. Immature western gulls tend to drop their prey more frequently than the older gulls do, most likely due to inconsistency in drop height as well as the height of the drops. Unlike most birds who drop their prey, western gulls actually seem to prefer softer substrates over larger substrates when dropping their prey, and only seem to drop their prey on hard surfaces if their prey is heavier.

==== Black-headed gulls ====
In observations made in Central Europe, a two-year-old black-headed gull was seen taking a small swan mussel about 18 m (60 ft) up into the air to drop on an asphalt road. It is unknown how successful the gull was seeing as a nearby crow stole the mussel. This was the first time prey-dropping was recorded in this species of gulls. It is likely that this behaviour is not common in this species of gull, as there is no other evidence of black-headed gulls dropping prey. It is more likely that this observation was due to the fact that there was a large group of hood crows during this study, and it may be that the gull observed was mimicking the prey-dropping behaviour of the hood crows nearby. This may be evident seeing as after the gull had dropped the mussel, it made no move to try and grab it for another drop. However, due to the fact that it was not only a single black-headed gull that was observed, but also a young bird, it is possible that successful prey-dropping may occur in other members of this species.

==== Sooty gulls ====
In 2009, two sooty gulls near Hamata, Egypt, were seen using prey-dropping behaviour on a strip of coral reef. Unlike other gulls, the gulls only flew up about 6 m and broke molluscs in one drop. All drops were successful.

=== Herons ===
The green heron (Butorides virescens) and its sister species the striated heron (Butorides striata) have been recorded using food (bread crusts), insects, leaves, and other small objects as bait to attract fish, which they then capture and eat.

== In fish ==
Archer fish shooting at prey

Several species of wrasses have been observed using rocks as anvils to crack bivalve (scallops, urchins and clams) shells. It was first filmed in an orange-dotted tuskfish (Choerodon anchorago) in 2009 by Giacomo Bernardi. The fish fans sand to unearth the bivalve, takes it into its mouth, swims several metres to a rock which it uses as an anvil and smashes the mollusc apart with sideward thrashes of the head. This behaviour has been recorded in a blackspot tuskfish (Choerodon schoenleinii) on Australia's Great Barrier Reef, yellowhead wrasse (Halichoeres garnoti) in Florida and a six-bar wrasse (Thalassoma hardwicke) in an aquarium setting. These species are at opposite ends of the phylogenetic tree in this family, so this behaviour may be a deep-seated trait in all wrasses.

It has been reported that freshwater stingrays use water as a tool by manipulating their bodies to direct a flow of water and extract food trapped amongst plants.

Prior to laying their eggs on a vertical rock face, male and female whitetail major damselfish clean the site by sand-blasting it. The fish pick up sand in their mouths and spit it against the rock face. Then they fan the area with their fins. Finally they remove the sand grains that remain stuck to the rock face by picking them off with their mouths.

Banded acara (Bujurquina vittata), South American cichlids, lay their eggs on a loose leaf. The male and female of a mating pair often "test" leaves before spawning: they pull and lift and turn candidate leaves, possibly trying to select leaves that are easy to move. After spawning, both parents guard the eggs. When disturbed, the parent acara often seize one end of the egg-carrying leaf in their mouth and drag it to deeper and safer locations.

Archerfish are found in the tropical mangrove swamps of India and Australasia. They approach the surface, take aim at insects that sit on plants above the surface, squirt a jet of water at them, and grab them after the insects have been knocked off into the water. The jet of water is formed by the action of the tongue, which presses against a groove in the roof of the mouth. Some archerfish can hit insects up to 1.5 m above the water surface. They use more water, which gives more force to the impact, when aiming at larger prey. Some triggerfish (e.g. Pseudobalistes fuscus) blow water to turn sea urchins over and expose their more vulnerable ventral side. Whether these later examples can be classified as tool use depends on which definition is being followed because there is no intermediate or manipulated object, however, they are examples of highly specialised natural adaptations.

== In invertebrates ==
=== Cephalopods ===
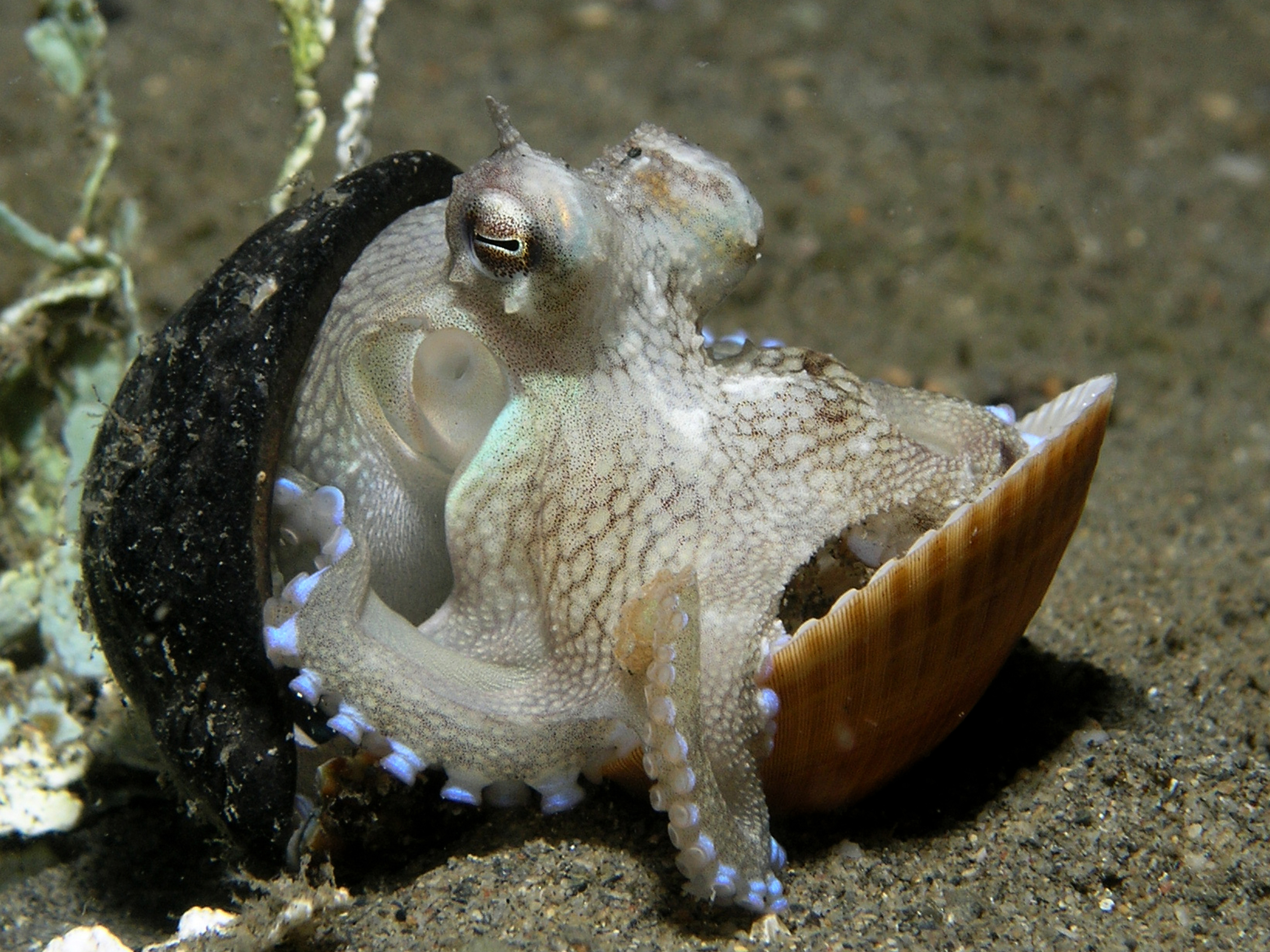
A small coconut octopus (4-5 cm, c. 2-inch diameter) using a nut shell and clam shell as shelter

At least four coconut octopus (Amphioctopus marginatus) individuals were witnessed retrieving coconut shells, manipulating them, stacking them, transporting them some distance (up to 20 metres), and then reassembling them to use as a shelter. The octopuses use coconut shells discarded by humans which have eventually settled in the ocean. They probe their arms down to loosen the mud, then rotate the shells out. After turning the shells so the open side faces upwards, the octopuses blow jets of mud out of the bowl before extending their arms around the shell—or if they have two halves, stacking them first, one inside the other. They then stiffen their legs and move away in a manner which has been called "stilt-walking". The octopuses eventually use the shells as a protective shelter in areas where little other shelter exists. If they just have one half, they simply turn it over and hide underneath. But if they are lucky enough to have retrieved two halves, they assemble them back into the original closed coconut form and sneak inside. The behaviour has been filmed. The authors of the research article claimed this behaviour falls under the definition of tool use because the shells are carried for later use. However, this argument remains contested by a number of other biologists who state that the shells actually provide continuous protection from abundant bottom-dwelling predators in their home range.

Octopuses deliberately place stones, shells and even bits of broken bottle to form a wall that constricts the aperture to the den, a type of tool use.

In laboratory studies, Octopus mercatoris, a small pygmy species of octopus, has been observed to block its lair using a plastic Lego brick.

Smaller individuals of the common blanket octopus (Tremoctopus violaceus) hold the tentacles of the Portuguese man o' war, to whose poison they are immune, both as protection and as a method of capturing prey.

=== Insects ===
Ants of the species Dorymyrmex bicolor pick up stones and other small objects with their mandibles and drop them down the vertical entrances of rival colonies, allowing workers to forage for food without competition.

Several species of ant are known to use substrate debris such as mud and leaves to transport water to their nest. A study in 2017 reported that when two species of Aphaenogaster ant are offered natural and artificial objects as tools for this activity, they choose items with a good soaking capacity. The ants develop a preference for artificial tools that cannot be found in their natural environment, indicating plasticity in their tool-use behaviour.

Hunting wasps of the genus Prionyx use weights (such as compacted sediment or a small pebble) to settle sand surrounding a recently provisioned burrow containing eggs and live prey in order to camouflage and seal the entrance. The wasp vibrates its wing muscles with an audible buzz while holding the weight in its mandibles, and applies the weight to the sand surrounding its burrow, causing the sand to vibrate and settle. Another hunting wasp, Ammophila, uses pebbles to close burrow entrances.

Some species of crickets construct acoustic baffles from the leaves of plants to amplify sounds they make for communication during mating. It was in 1975 that scientists first observed Oecanthus burmeisteri and two other species of South African chirping crickets doing this.

Insects can also learn to use tools. A study in 2017 showed that bumblebees of the species Bombus terrestris learned to move a small wooden ball to a goal for a sucrose reward.

=== Spiders ===
Some spiders of the genus Ariadna have been observed selecting small stones and placing them around the entrances of their burrows, where the stones improve the effectiveness of the spiders' trip lines for detecting prey.

== See also ==
- Animal cognition
- Animal-computer interaction
- Bird intelligence
- Cephalopod intelligence
- Cetacean intelligence
- Elephant intelligence
- Embodied cognition
- Fish intelligence
- Structures built by animals
- Hermit crab (shell, anemone)
- "Cow Tools", a cartoon which parodies the topic
- Primate archaeology
- Zoopharmacognosy (medicinal plant use by animals)
