= The Far Side =

Comic strip by Gary Larson

- Wiener Dog Art (1990), one of 16 published The Far Side cartoon compilations, featuring surrealist humor of an artist stamping a paint-covered dachshund on a canvas.
- Author: Gary Larson
- Website: www.thefarside.com
- Current status/schedule: Active
- Launch date: January 1, 1980; 46 years ago
- Syndicates: Chronicle Features (1980–1985); Universal Press Syndicate (1985–1996)
- Genre(s): Humor, satire, black comedy, avant-garde
- Preceded by: Nature's Way

The Far Side is a single-paneled comic strip created by Gary Larson and syndicated by Chronicle Features and then Universal Press Syndicate, which ran from January 1, 1980 through January 1, 1995 (when Larson retired as a cartoonist). Its surrealistic humor is often based on uncomfortable social situations, improbable events, an anthropomorphic view of the world, logical fallacies, impending bizarre disasters, (often twisted) references to proverbs, or the search for meaning in life. Larson's frequent use of animals and nature in the comic is popularly attributed to his background in biology. The Far Side was carried by more than 1,900 daily newspapers, translated into 17 languages, and collected into calendars, greeting cards, and 23 compilation books, and reruns are still carried in many newspapers. After a 25-year hiatus, in July 2020, Larson began drawing new Far Side strips offered through the comic's official website.

Larson was recognized for his work on the strip with the National Cartoonist Society Newspaper Panel Cartoon Award for 1985 and 1988, and with their Reuben Award for 1990 and 1994. The Far Side won the 2020 Webby People's Voice Award for Humor in the category Web.

== History ==
=== Creation (1979) ===
The Far Side was created by Gary Larson, a cartoonist based in Seattle, Washington. Larson enjoyed drawing as a child but never thought he would become a cartoonist; thus, he never studied art in school outside of required classes. Larson had been inspired to draw comics when he was younger from the strip Alley Oop, and later drew further inspiration from MAD Magazine and the work of Don Martin. He also enjoys comics from Gahan Wilson, B. Kliban and George Booth where humor was derived more from the comics' composition than dialogue, which Larson considered "something almost organic going on between the humor and the art that conveyed it".

In 1976, Larson was working as a cashier at a retail music store when he realized how much he hated his job. Two days into this "career crisis", Larson sat down at his kitchen table and drew six cartoons. The next day, he showed the cartoons to an editor at the local magazine Pacific Search. The editor was impressed and paid him US$90, so Larson quit his job to start cartooning and created Nature's Way, a single-panel comic strip that served as the basis for The Far Side. Larson showed Nature's Way to the editor of the weekly newspaper Summer News Review, who began to publish it on a regular basis.

Although Larson was initially excited to be published, he was only paid US$3 a cartoon. Eventually, he stopped and became an investigator for the local humane society. In 1979, a reporter for the Seattle Times who had met Larson while investigating "pony abuse" showed Nature's Way to her editor. It was revived and began appearing in the Saturday edition of the paper. Larson was paid US$15 a cartoon. After about a year, Larson took a vacation from his humane society work to drive to San Francisco at the encouragement of his girlfriend. In what he called a "daring plan to expand this 'publication empire'", Larson left a portfolio with his work at the headquarters of the San Francisco Chronicle. After several days, Larson was informed that editor Stan Arnold wanted to speak with him. Arnold was impressed by his work and mentioned that, should the Chronicle be interested in Larson's work, it could become syndicated.

When Larson returned to Seattle, he received a letter informing him Nature's Way had been canceled because it generated too many complaints; he attributes this to the fact it ran next to a crossword puzzle aimed at children. Larson believes had this happened a week before, he would not have gone to San Francisco. The next day, Arnold called Larson and told him the syndicate affiliate of the Chronicle decided to syndicate his work. The affiliate, Chronicle Features, coined the name The Far Side; Larson joked Chronicle "could have called it 'Revenge of the Zucchini People' for all I cared." Larson's initial contract for The Far Side called for it to have a cast of recurring characters (like how Peanuts had Charlie Brown), because Chronicle believed newspaper comics needed familiar characters to be successful. However, Larson disagreed, feeling it would be limiting and diminish the humor of the strip. In his first month of syndication, Larson made about US$100. The contract with Chronicle lasted four years. After it expired, Universal Press Syndicate picked up the syndication rights.

=== Publication (1979–1995) ===
The Far Side made its debut in the January 1, 1980, edition of the Chronicle, and a few months later, Chronicle Features began to offer it to other papers. While it was only in four papers by 1982, by 1983 that number had increased to eighty, and by 1985 it had reached two hundred. Initially, Larson drew six cartoons a week, which were sent to papers a few weeks in advance. By 1987, he was drawing seven cartoons a week. From October 1988 to January 1990, Larson took a hiatus from The Far Side to travel abroad and study jazz guitar with Jim Hall. When he resumed working on The Far Side in 1990, he negotiated an agreement in which he would only have to draw five cartoons a week. The final Far Side comic was run in newspapers on January 1, 1995. Larson wrote a letter to his followers in October 1994 that explained he was ending the series due to "simple fatigue" and avoid having The Far Side fall into the "Graveyard of Mediocre Cartoons" if he continued. Larson also later stated he wanted to pursue a career as a jazz guitarist.

During its 15-year run, Larson produced a total of 4,337 Far Side cartoons. By the time of its conclusion, the series was carried in more than 1,900 papers and translated into 17 languages. Universal briefly re-syndicated The Far Side for a three-month period in late 2003 to promote the release of the anthology The Complete Far Side: 1980–1994, and many newspapers still publish reprints.

=== Hiatus (1995–2019) ===
Larson has expressed disapproval of the distribution of his cartoons on the internet and has requested that fans do not do so; he wrote in a letter that his work is too personal and important to him to have others "take control of it". For this reason, Universal's online service GoComics does not offer Far Side cartoons. In at least one case, he had sent out a cease and desist letter to a comics-aggregation site for reproducing The Far Side online. While an official Far Side site existed, it only offered information related to the comic and published books, but did not offer any of the strips.

In 2003, Gary Larson drew a cover for the November 17 edition of The New Yorker magazine (the Cartoon Issue), a prestigious offer he said he could not refuse.

=== Online revival (2019–present) ===
On September 13, 2019, the official Far Side site was updated with a major redesign, teasing that "[a] new online era of The Far Side" would be forthcoming. The full site was launched on December 17, 2019. It features a "daily dose" of several randomly selected Far Side comics, a weekly themed collection, and additional material including art from Larson's sketchbooks. Larson wrote in an open letter announcing the site that he hoped that the official online presence of The Far Side would encourage sites presently hosting his comics to take them down and direct readers to the official site. Larson said that while he does not plan to draw regular Far Side comics, he may include new material every once in a while when updating the site.

On July 7, 2020, Larson released new Far Side strips for the first time in 25 years on the website. Unlike his previous work with pen and paper, Larson transitioned to using a graphics tablet for the comic. In an accompanying post, Larson explained that frustration with his pens clogging from disuse on the rare occasions when he drew following his retirement (primarily for his annual Christmas card) led him to try working on a digital tablet. The new freedom and possibilities offered by the digital medium meant that he soon found he "was having fun drawing again". Larson made it clear that he was not resuming production of a daily cartoon, but was "exploring, experimenting and trying stuff."

== Design and themes ==
The Far Side is primarily told through the use of a single, vertical, rectangular panel, occasionally split into small sections of four, six, or eight for storytelling purposes. A caption or dialogue usually appears under the panel as typed text, although speech balloons are sometimes used for conversations. Certain strips, mostly those published on Sundays, are double-sized, colored, and have handwritten captions. When Larson drew panels they were 6 in × 7.5 in (15 cm × 19 cm), he penciled until the image "closely approximate[d]" his vision, and then he would ink it. The caption was handwritten in pencil underneath the cartoon. When Universal received a cartoon, it would set the caption to the usual typeface and add copyright and publication dates.

The series is characterized by its unconventional, often surrealistic, style of humor. Brigham Young University professor Kerry Soper described it as "an anomaly" among other newspaper cartoons and ComicsAlliance wrote it was "surreal, random, and occasionally very dark". Larson was influenced by his family's "morbid" sense of humor. His older brother Dan, who would often play pranks on him that took advantage of his fears, was a particular influence. He also drew inspiration from personal experience, Mad, and his favorite childhood book, Mr. Bear Squash-You-All-Flat. Larson sought to mock the human condition, often by placing animals in human positions. Fear is also recurring in the strip; The Far Side was produced in a time when horror comedy was becoming popular.

Recurring themes in The Far Side include people stranded on desert islands, aliens, Heaven, Hell, the life of cavemen, and medieval dungeons. Animals—especially cows—are also common. Larson focused on subjects he considered taboo because he wanted his cartoons to be personal statements. Larson's editors refused to publish strips they found indecent, offensive, or hard to understand. Examples include cowboys roasting a horse over a fire because they are "hungry enough to eat one" and a bird eating scrambled babies. Generally, they also avoided publishing cartoons with scatological humor; Larson recalled that during the strip's first few years he was not even allowed to draw an outhouse. Larson often disagreed with his editors' decisions and was sometimes successful in getting rejected cartoons published, although he does admit most of their decisions likely saved his career. Larson also says he never tried to intentionally offend readers.

While Larson frequently used the same stereotypical characters (such as a woman with a beehive hairdo), he purposely did not name his characters nor imply they were the same characters from cartoon to cartoon. He did not want to have a character-based series, as the characters were there to help serve the humor of the comic.

== Notable cartoons ==
=== Cow Tools ===
Cow Tools is the name of a 1982 Far Side cartoon. It shows a cow standing behind a table with strange objects, with the cartoon's caption "Cow tools". While most of the displayed tools had no apparent function, one was similar to a saw. The cartoon has been described as "arguably the most loathed" Far Side strip, with Reddit posters calling it the series' "notoriously confusing cartoon". Larson was frequently asked about the meaning of the cartoon by the media, and received numerous letters, some angry and questioning where the humor was in the comic. Larson said in Prehistory of the Far Side that he had so much mail from this strip he had to issue a press release to explain that there was nothing to explain about the Cow Tools comic.

=== Jane Goodall cartoon ===
One The Far Side cartoon shows two chimpanzees grooming. One finds a blonde human hair on the other and inquires, "Conducting a little more 'research' with that Jane Goodall tramp?" Goodall herself was in Africa at the time, and the Jane Goodall Institute felt the cartoon was in bad taste; the organization had its lawyers draft a letter to Larson and his distribution syndicate, in which the cartoon was labeled an "atrocity." These efforts were stymied by Goodall herself when she returned and saw the cartoon and stated that she found it amusing, commenting "It all helps to put us humans in our place, and we desperately need putting in our place." Since then, all profits from sales of a shirt featuring this cartoon go to the Jane Goodall Institute. Goodall wrote a preface to The Far Side Gallery 5, detailing her version of the controversy, and the institute's letter was included next to the cartoon in the complete Far Side collection. She praised Larson's creative ideas, which often compare and contrast the behavior of humans and animals.

=== The Thagomizer ===
In 1982, Larson published a comic in which a prehistoric lecturer refers to the then previously unnamed tail spikes of the Stegosaurus as the "thagomizer" because, according to the prehistoric lecturer, a caveman named Thag Simmons had been killed by those spikes. The arrangement of spikes originally had no distinct name, but Larson's neologism was adopted gradually by paleontologists and has been used in scientific literature.

=== Protests against certain cartoons ===
The Complete Far Side and The Prehistory of The Far Side include letters from angry readers alongside the comics that prompted them. The letters were written to newspaper publishers and often demanded the removal of The Far Side. Despite these protests, The Far Side remained popular and continued to run in many newspapers. Larson often laughs at the controversies as evidenced in The Prehistory of The Far Side, in which he writes that the people complaining have usually misunderstood the cartoon.

== Collected editions ==
There are 23 collected editions of The Far Side, which combined have sold over 45 million copies and have generated US$70 million in revenue. The books are published by Andrews McMeel Publishing, an affiliate of Universal. Andrews McMeel acquired the rights to publish collected editions of the series in 1982, the year the first Far Side book was released. It was surprisingly successful, which influenced Larson's decision to sign on with Universal after his contract with Chronicle expired. In January 1985, the four Far Side books out at the time—The Far Side, The Far Side Gallery, Beyond the Far Side and In Search of the Far Side—were simultaneous bestsellers; Jim Davis's Garfield was the only newspaper comic that had previously accomplished this feat. New Far Side books continued to be published after the series concluded and remain in print and popular today.

During his 14-month hiatus, Larson produced The PreHistory of The Far Side: A 10th Anniversary Exhibit, a Far Side anthology that commemorates the series' 10th anniversary. It contains commentary on individual strips, letters from angry readers, unpublished cartoons, and some of Larson's personal favorite Far Sides. In 2003, Andrews McMeel released the two-volume, twenty-pound anthology The Complete Far Side: 1980—1994. The Complete Far Side contains every Far Side cartoon syndicated and, when it was initially published, retailed for US$135. Larson spent three years working on it; the majority of work went into redrawing characters' eyeballs because he was unhappy how they looked when transferred digitally. It sold 350,000 copies and at the time was the most expensive New York Times bestseller. A new, lighter edition of The Complete Far Side was released in 2014.

Main series
Title	Date	ISBN
The Far Side	September 1982	ISBN 0-8362-1200-2
Beyond The Far Side	August 1983	ISBN 0-8362-1149-9
In Search of The Far Side	August 1984	ISBN 0-8362-2060-9
Bride of The Far Side	April 1985	ISBN 0-8362-2066-8
Valley of The Far Side	August 1985	ISBN 0-8362-2067-6
It Came from The Far Side	August 1986	ISBN 0-8362-2073-0
The Hound of The Far Side	April 1987	ISBN 0-8362-2087-0
The Far Side Observer	October 1987	ISBN 0-8362-2098-6
Night of the Crash-Test Dummies	July 1988	ISBN 0-8362-2049-8
Wildlife Preserves	April 1989	ISBN 0-8362-1842-6
Wiener Dog Art	October 1990	ISBN 0-8362-1865-5
Unnatural Selections	November 1991	ISBN 0-8362-1881-7
Cows of Our Planet	November 1992	ISBN 0-8362-1701-2
The Chickens are Restless	November 1993	ISBN 0-8362-1717-9
The Curse of Madame "C"	November 1994	ISBN 0-8362-1763-2
Last Chapter and Worse	October 1996	ISBN 0-8362-2131-1

The Far Side Gallery series
Title	Date	ISBN
The Far Side Gallery	November 1984	ISBN 0-8362-2062-5
The Far Side Gallery 2	October 1986	ISBN 0-8362-2085-4
The Far Side Gallery 3	October 1988	ISBN 0-8362-1831-0
The Far Side Gallery 4	October 1993	ISBN 0-8362-1724-1
The Far Side Gallery 5	September 1995	ISBN 0-8362-0425-5

Anthologies
Title	Date	ISBN
The PreHistory of The Far Side: A 10th Anniversary Exhibit	January 1989	ISBN 0-8362-1851-5
The Complete Far Side: 1980–1994	August 2003	ISBN 0-7407-2113-5
The Complete Far Side: 1980–1994	November 2014	ISBN 1-449-46004-6

== Merchandise and other media ==
A large amount of Far Side merchandise was produced, ranging from greeting cards, posters, t-shirts, and mugs. For many years, Larson produced a yearly calendar that contained a Far Side cartoon for each day of the year. He stopped making them annually in 2002, but created another edition in 2006; all proceeds from this edition went to Conservation International. In the years they were available, Far Side greeting cards and calendars sold 110 million and 45 million copies, respectively. Larson stated in 1987 he was personally embarrassed by how much money he made from Far Side merchandise.

== Adaptations ==
=== Tales from the Far Side ===
In 1994, Larson produced an animated special, Tales from the Far Side, featuring his art style and gags from the strips. He produced a sequel in 1997.

=== Unproduced film ===
In 2021, Dirk Blocker shared some behind-the-scenes photos from a screen test for a live-action film adaptation. In 1983, Alan Rudolph began work on a script and later pitched the film to Columbia Pictures. The project was greenlit under CEO David Puttnam and publicly announced as part of the studio's upcoming slate. Following Puttnam's departure a year later, Rudolph created a screen test as a proof of concept for Paramount, who liked the concept but found the footage confusing and ultimately passed on the film.

== Exhibitions ==
In 1987, a special exhibit of 527 black and white Far Side panels was shown in the Smithsonian Institution's National Museum of Natural History in Washington, D.C. 127 of the panels were originals, displayed in the rotunda on boards that held 50 panels each. Later the display became a traveling exhibit that was shown in San Francisco, Washington, D.C., Orlando, Chicago, Toronto, New York City, Denver, and Los Angeles.

There was a Far Side gallery at the California Academy of Sciences that featured some of Larson's panels. The exhibit included a giant microscope under which visitors could stand, based on one of Larson's cartoons. Looking up through the objective lens revealed a giant blinking eyeball. The building was torn down and replaced and the exhibit is no longer in the new facility.

== Legacy ==
As described by Sarah Larson (who is unrelated to creator Gary Larson) for The New Yorker, The Far Side's initial run came at a time when newspaper comics were generally more grounded, such as Peanuts, Garfield, For Better or For Worse and Doonesbury. The comic also helped introduce more modern and surreal humor into the comic pages that influenced other strips such as Calvin and Hobbes and Bloom County; it also has brought nerd humor to the forefront, reflected in series like The Simpsons.

== See also ==
- Bizarro
- Rhymes with Orange
- Non Sequitur
- Serratoterga larsoni
- Strigiphilus garylarsoni
