= Gary Larson =

American cartoonist (born 1950)

- Born: August 14, 1950 (age 76) Tacoma, Washington, U.S.
- Area: Cartoonist
- Notable works: The Far Side
- Spouse: Toni Carmichael (m. 1987)

Gary Larson (born August 14, 1950) is an American cartoonist who created The Far Side, a single-panel cartoon series that was syndicated internationally to more than 1,900 newspapers for fifteen years. The series ended on January 1, 1995, though since 2020 Larson has published additional comics online. His twenty-three books of collected cartoons have combined sales of more than 45 million copies.

== Early life and education ==
Larson was born and raised in University Place, Washington, in suburban Tacoma, the son of Verner, a car salesman, and Doris, a secretary. He graduated from Curtis Senior High School in University Place and from Washington State University in Pullman with a degree in communications. During high school and college, he played jazz guitar and banjo.

Larson said his family has "a morbid sense of humor", and that he was influenced by the "paranoid" sense of humor of his older brother, Dan. Dan played pranks on Gary, for example by taking advantage of his fear of monsters under the bed by waiting in the closet for the right moment to pounce. Dan "scared the hell out of me" whenever he could, Gary said, but also nurtured Gary's love of scientific knowledge. They caught animals in Puget Sound and placed them in terrariums in the basement, and also made a small desert ecosystem.

== Career ==
=== Early cartoon work ===
According to Larson in his 1989 anthology The Prehistory of The Far Side, he was working in a music store when he took a few days off, after finally realizing how much he hated his job. During that time, he decided to try cartooning. In 1976, he drew six cartoons and submitted them to Pacific Search (afterward Pacific Northwest Magazine), a Seattle-based magazine. After contributing to another local Seattle paper, in 1979 Larson submitted his work to The Seattle Times. Under the title Nature's Way, his work was published weekly next to the Junior Jumble.

To supplement his income, Larson worked for the Humane Society as a cruelty investigator.

=== The Far Side ===
Larson decided that he could increase his income from cartooning by selling his Nature's Way strip to another newspaper. While on vacation in San Francisco, he pitched his work to the San Francisco Chronicle and, to his surprise, the Chronicle bought the strip and promoted it for syndication, renaming it The Far Side. Its first appearance in the Chronicle was on January 1, 1980. A week later, The Seattle Times dropped Nature's Way. Unlike Charles Schulz, who resented the name Peanuts imposed by his publisher, Larson had no such qualms, saying, "They could have called it Revenge of the Zucchini People, for all I cared."

The Far Side ran for fifteen years, syndicated initially by Chronicle Features and later by Universal Press Syndicate, until Larson retired with his final strip published on January 1, 1995.

Themes in The Far Side were often surreal. Often, the behavior of supposedly superior humans was compared with animals. Animals and other creatures were frequently presented anthropomorphically.

One of Larson's more famous cartoons shows a chimpanzee couple grooming. The female finds a blond human hair on the male and inquires, "Conducting a little more 'research' with that Jane Goodall tramp?" A representative from the Jane Goodall Institute thought that this was in bad taste and wrote a critical letter to Larson regarding the cartoon. Larson contacted the Goodall Institute to apologize only to find that Goodall herself, who had been in Africa at the time of the cartoon's publication and only learned of it years after its initial publication, approved of it, stating that she found it amusing. Since then, all profits from sales of a shirt featuring this cartoon go to the Goodall Institute. Goodall wrote a preface to The Far Side Gallery 5, detailing her version of the "Jane Goodall Tramp" controversy. She praised Larson's creative ideas, which often compare and contrast the behavior of humans and animals.

Larson's The Far Side cartoons were syndicated worldwide and published in many collections. They were also reproduced extensively on greeting cards which were very popular, but these were discontinued in March 2009. Two animated versions were produced for television: Tales from the Far Side (1994) and Tales from the Far Side II (1997). A 2007 The Far Side calendar donated all author royalties to Conservation International.

The significance of many of Larson's cartoons resulted in a major display of over 400 of his original works at the California Academy of Sciences in 1985.

=== Retirement ===
By late 1994, Larson thought the series was getting repetitive and did not want to enter what he called the "Graveyard of Mediocre Cartoons." He retired the strip on January 1, 1995, when he was 44 years old. Since retiring from The Far Side, Larson has done occasional cartoon work, including magazine illustrations and promotional artwork for The Far Side merchandise. For the most part, he has also retired from public view: "He refuses to have his picture taken and avoids being on TV", Time magazine wrote in 2003. According to Larson, "cartoonists are expected to be anonymous."

=== There's a Hair in My Dirt!: A Worm's Story ===
There's a Hair in My Dirt!: A Worm's Story
- Author: Gary Larson
- Illustrator: Gary Larson
- Publisher: HarperCollins
- Publication date: 1998
- ISBN: 0-06-093274-0
- OCLC: 42894109

In 1998, Larson published his first post-The Far Side book There's a Hair in My Dirt!: A Worm's Story, an illustrated book with thematic similarities to The Far Side. The short book tells the story of an earthworm who feels that his life is insignificant. The main plot is told by the young worm's father and follows the beautiful (but slightly dim) human maiden Harriet, who takes a stroll across a woodland trail, encountering different aspects of the ecological world. She admires it but knows little about the land around her, and that eventually leads to her downfall.

The story became a New York Times Best Seller on May 24, 1998.

=== Digital era ===
In 2020, Larson began sporadically posting new cartoons on his website; he attributed the appearance of new material to his newfound motivation gained by using a graphics tablet.

== Personal life ==
In 1987, Larson married Toni Carmichael, an anthropologist. Early in their relationship, Carmichael became his business manager.

In The Complete Far Side, Larson says that his greatest disappointment in life occurred when he was at a luncheon and sat across from cartoonist Charles Addams, creator of The Addams Family. Larson was not able to think of a single thing to say to him and deeply regretted the missed opportunity. Addams died in 1988.

Larson is an environmentalist and lives in Seattle, Washington.

=== Other works and interests ===
Larson has been playing jazz guitar since his teen years. He took advanced lessons from jazz guitarists Remo Palmier and Herb Ellis. In exchange for guitar lessons from Ellis, Larson provided him with the cover illustration for the album Doggin' Around (Concord, 1988) by Ellis and bassist Red Mitchell.

Larson drew a cover for the November 17, 2003, edition of The New Yorker magazine, an offer he felt was too prestigious to refuse.

Larson voiced himself in a 2010 episode of The Simpsons, "Once Upon a Time in Springfield".

== Online presence ==
Since 1999, Larson has objected to his work being displayed on the internet, and has been sending takedown notices to owners of fan websites and users posting his cartoons. In a personal letter included with the requests, Larson claimed that his work is too personal and important to him to have others "take control of it". In 2007, he also published an open letter on the web to the same effect.

In September 2019, The Far Side website stated that "a new online era of the Far Side is coming!" On December 17, 2019, www.thefarside.com, authorized by Larson and dedicated to The Far Side cartoon series, went live on the internet. On July 8, 2020, Larson released a new section of The Far Side website titled "New Stuff".

== Awards and honors ==
Larson was awarded the Newspaper Panel Cartoon Award by the National Cartoonists Society in 1985 and 1988, earned the society's Reuben Award for 1990 and 1994, and has been recognized for various individual strips by the National Cartoonists Society in 1989, 1990, 1991, 1993 and 1995.

On March 15, 1989, a newly discovered insect species was named after Larson by Dale H. Clayton, head of the Committee of Evolutionary Biology at the University of Chicago. The Strigiphilus garylarsoni is a chewing louse of a genus found only on owls. Wrote Larson: "I considered this an extreme honor. Besides, I knew no one was going to write and ask to name a new species of swan after me. You have to grab these opportunities when they come along." An 8" × 11" (20 × 28 cm) magnification of the insect appeared in the Prehistory of the Far Side 10th anniversary compilation, along with the letter requesting permission to use his name. Similarly, an Ecuadorian rainforest butterfly was named after him; Serratoterga larsoni. The term "thagomizer", a feature of stegosaurus anatomy, was coined in a Far Side cartoon.

Eighteen years after earning his bachelor's degree at Washington State, Larson gave the commencement address at his alma mater in 1990.

== See also ==
- Cow Tools, a notorious Larson cartoon
- Thagomizer, a scientific term derived from a Larson cartoon
