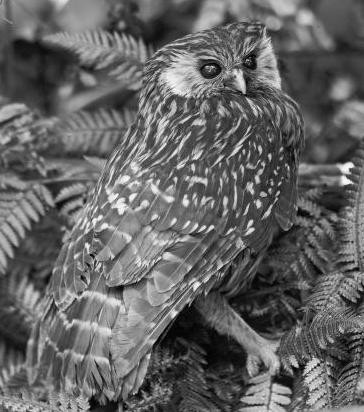
- Live N. a. albifacies specimen photographed between 1889 and 1910

Conservation status
- Extinct (1914) (IUCN 3.1)

- Extinct (1914) (NZ TCS)

Scientific classification
- Kingdom: Animalia
- Phylum: Chordata
- Class: Aves
- Order: Strigiformes
- Family: Strigidae
- Genus: Ninox
- Species: †N. albifacies

Binomial name
- †Ninox albifacies (Gray, GR, 1844)

Subspecies
- N. a. albifacies (South Island laughing owl); N. a. rufifacies (North Island laughing owl)
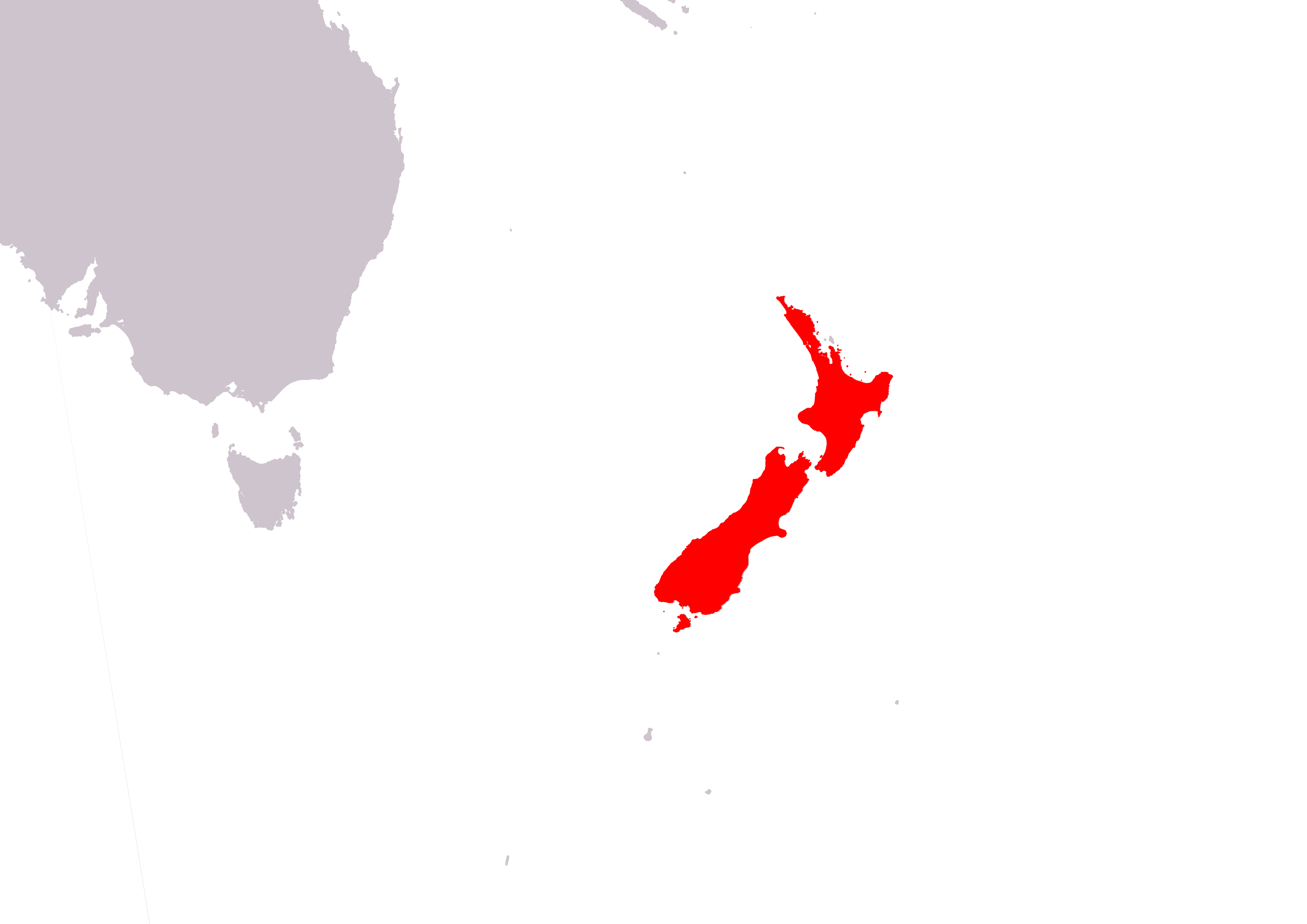
- Range of N. albifacies Extinct

Synonyms
- Sceloglaux albifacies Ieraglaux albifacies Athene albifacies

= Laughing owl =

Extinct species of owl

The laughing owl (Ninox albifacies), also known as whēkau, laughing jackass, or white-faced owl, is an extinct species of owl that was endemic to New Zealand. It was widespread when European settlers arrived, and its scientific description was published in 1845. The species declined rapidly there after and was largely or completely extinct by 1914. The laughing owl was classified in the monotypic genus Sceloglaux by Johann Jakob Kaup in 1848, a name meaning "scoundrel owl" that may have referred to its unusual, mischievous-sounding calls. Genetic studies have subsequently indicated that it is more closely related to the boobook owls of the genus Ninox.

== Taxonomy ==
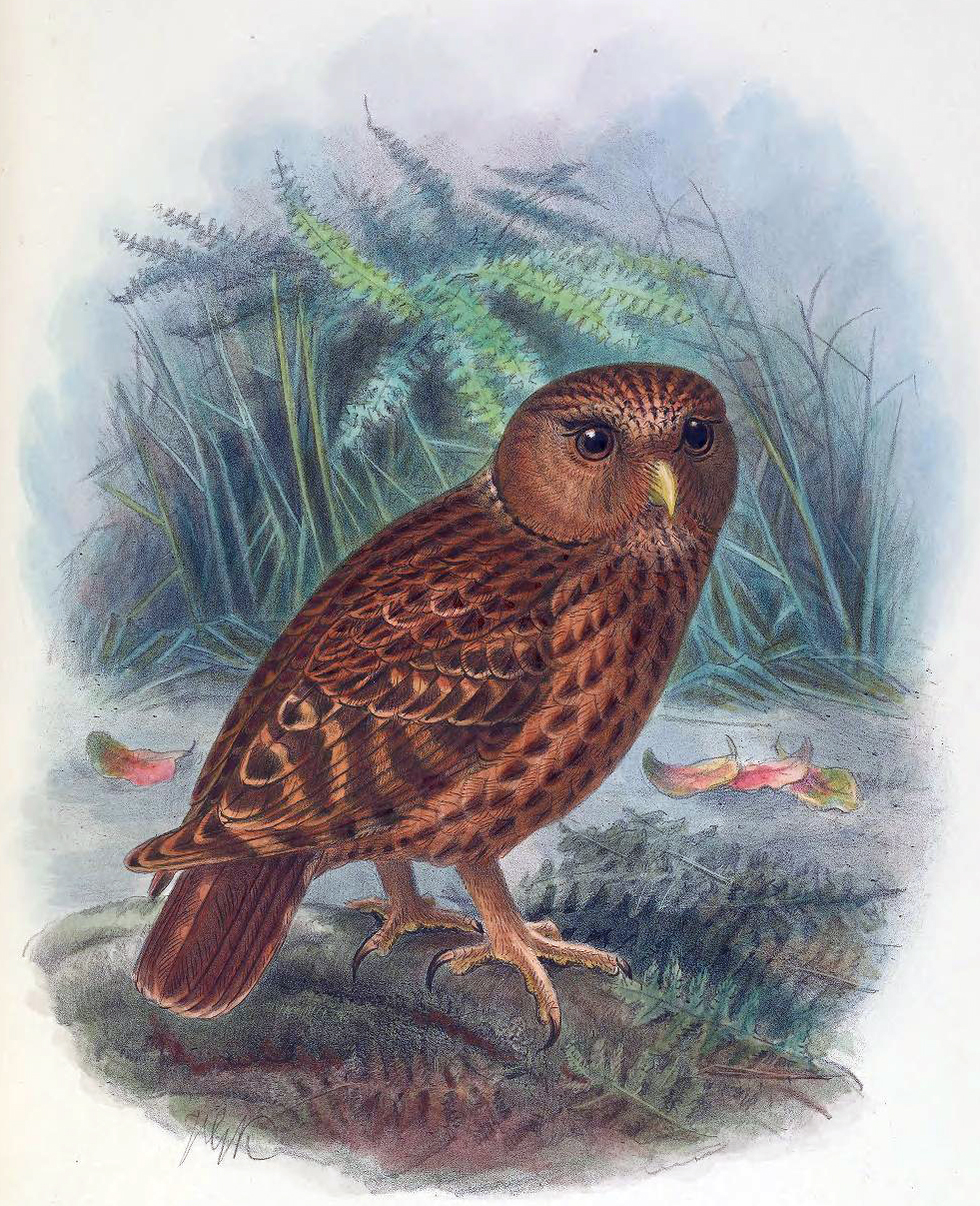
N. a. rufifacies

The laughing owl was originally described as Athene albifacies by George Robert Gray in 1844, based on a specimen from Waikouaiti, South Island. The type specimen is held at the British Museum (Reg. no. 1845.1.13.5).

The species was later transferred by Johann Jakob Kaup to other genera, first to the monotypic genus Sceloglaux (as S. albifacies) in 1848 and later to Ieraglaux (as I. albifacies) in 1852. Recent genetic studies now include it with the boobook owls in the genus Ninox, as N. albifacies.

Two subspecies of laughing owl have been described. In the North Island, specimens of the smaller subspecies N. a. rufifacies were allegedly collected from the forest districts of Mount Taranaki (1856) and the Wairarapa (1868); the unclear history of the latter and the eventual disappearance of both led to suspicions that the bird may not have occurred in the North Island at all. This theory has been refuted, however, after ample subfossil bones of the species were found in the North Island. Sight records exist from Porirua and Te Karaka; according to Māori tradition, the species last occurred in Te Urewera.

In the South Island, the larger subspecies N. a. albifacies inhabited low rainfall districts, including Nelson, Canterbury, and Otago. They were also found in the central mountains and possibly Fiordland. Specimens of N. a. albifacies were collected from Stewart Island / Rakiura in or around 1881.

== Scientific specimens ==
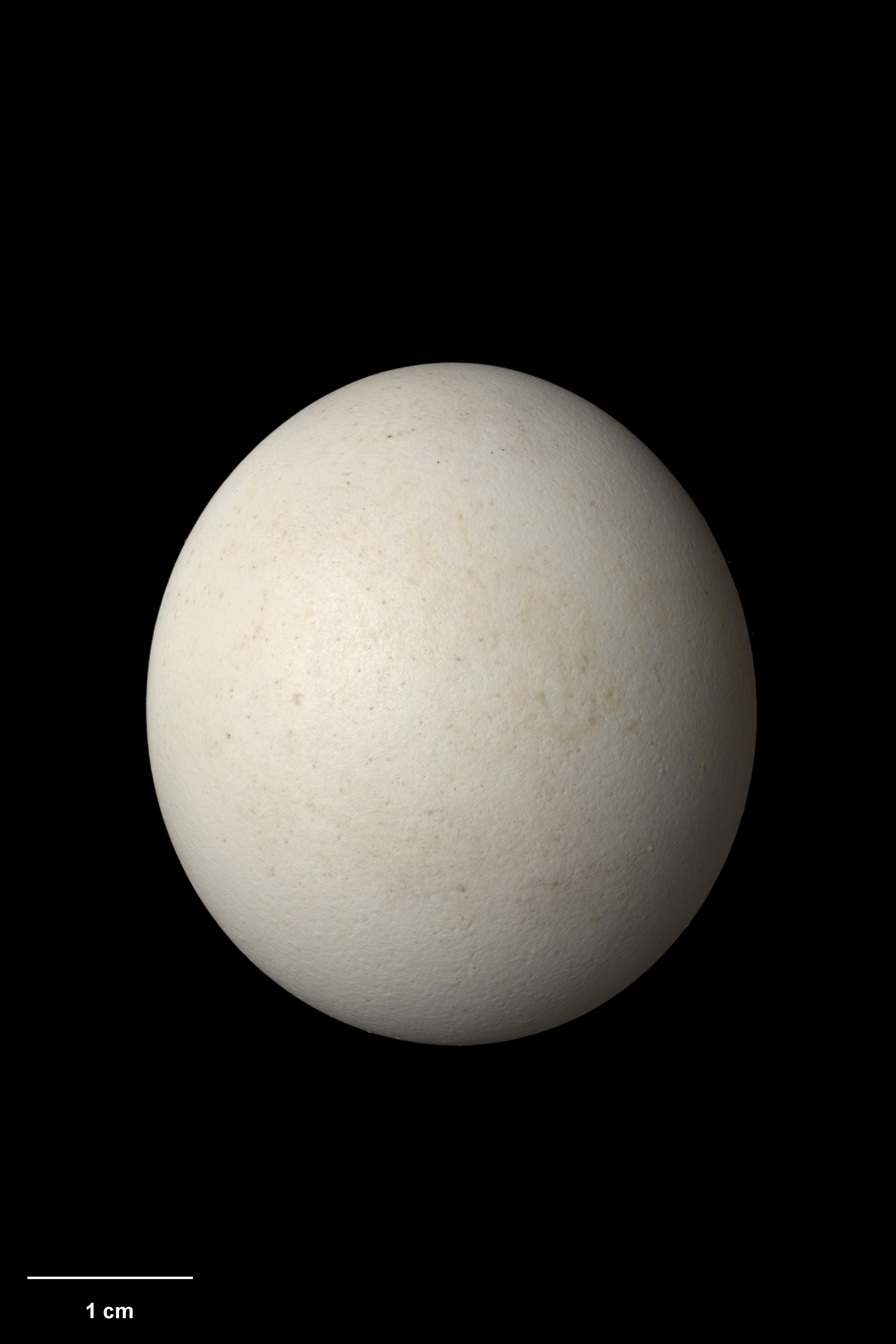
Ninox albifacies egg specimen held at Te Papa

There are 57 body and 17 egg specimens in public collections. Of these, either the specimen at NHMW (no. 50.809) or one at the Universidad de Concepción is the likely type of N. a. rufifacies. Additional specimens are located at Cambridge, Massachusetts (probably Harvard Museum of Natural History) and Edinburgh (Royal Museum).

== Phylogeny ==
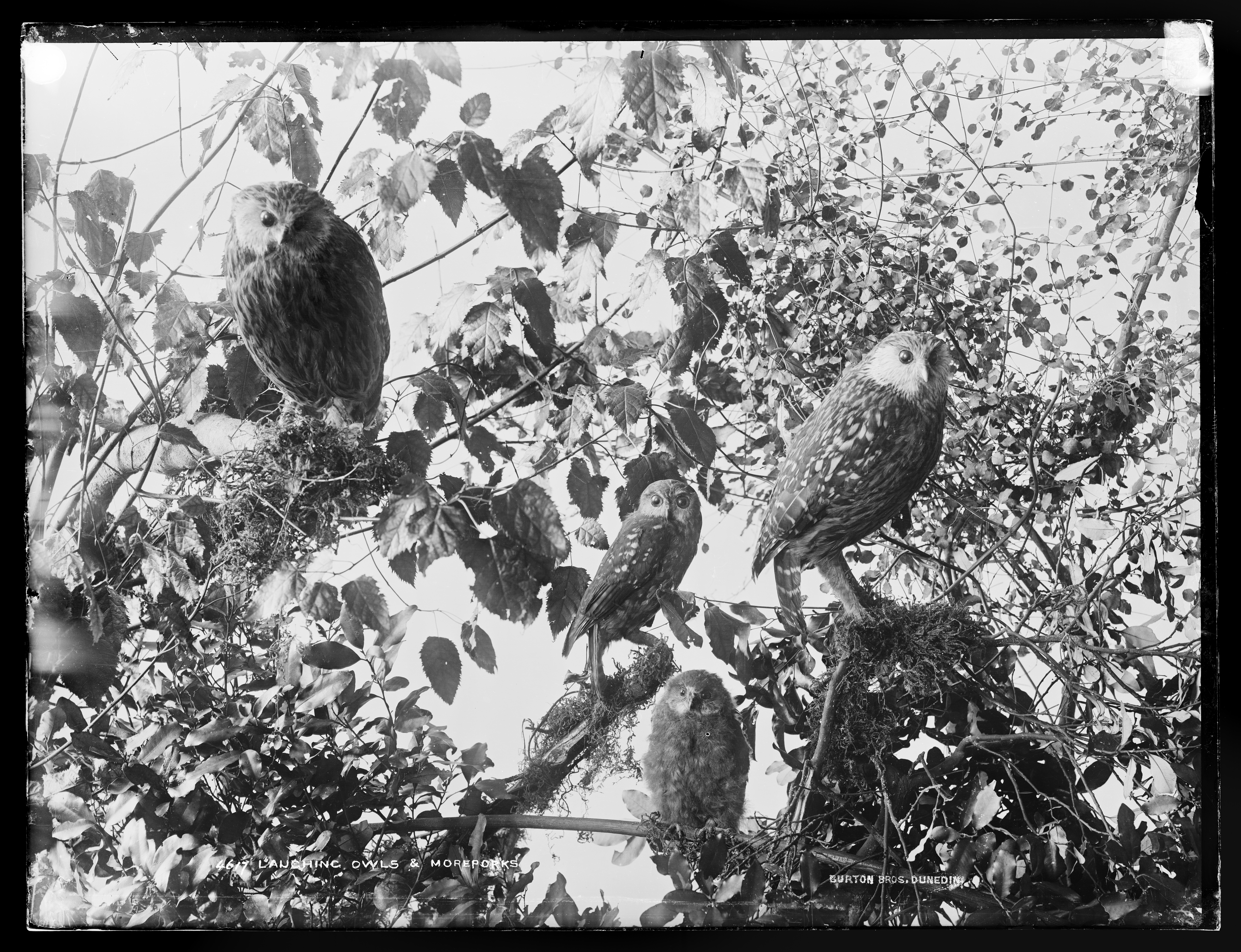
Laughing owls and moreporks in a taxidermy exhibition, Burton Brothers photographic studio, 1889

A 2016 study of the laughing owl's mitogenome concluded that the species does not belong to the monotypic genus Sceloglaux as previously thought, but instead belong to the genus Ninox. The analysis indicated that the laughing owl may be a sister taxon to the Ninox clade containing the barking owl, Sumba boobook, and morepork, the latter of which shared New Zealand with the laughing owl.

== Description ==
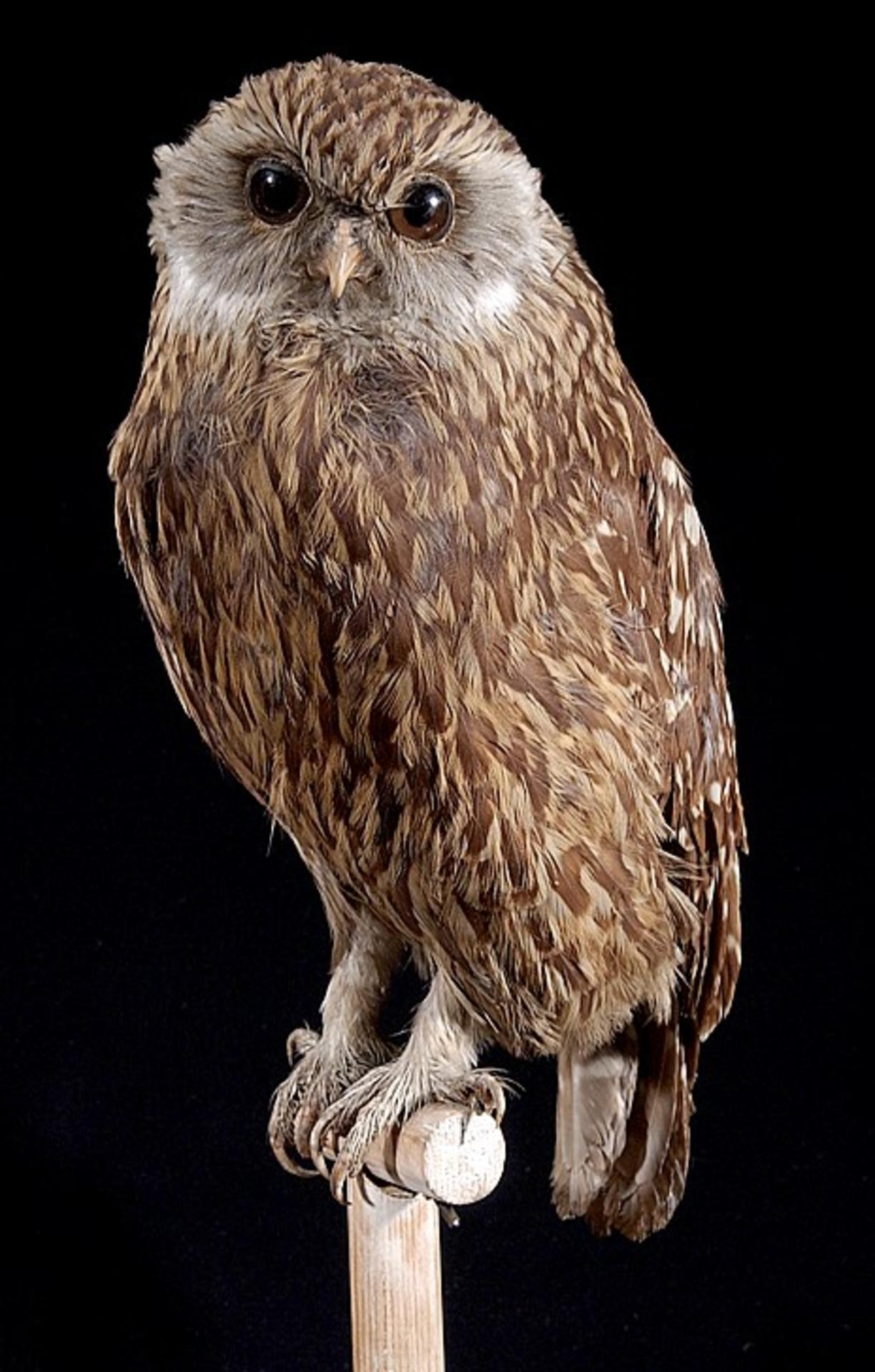
Male laughing owl mount from the collection of Naturalis Biodiversity Centre

The laughing owl's plumage was yellowish-brown striped with dark brown. White straps were on the scapulars, and occasionally the hind neck. Mantle feathers were edged with white. The wings and tail had light-brown bars. The tarsus had yellowish to reddish-buff feathers. The facial disc was white behind and below the eyes, fading to grey with brown stripes towards the centre. Some birds were more rufous, with a brown facial disk; this was at first attributed to subspecific differences, but is probably better related to individual variation. Males were thought to be more often of the richly coloured morph (e.g. the Linz specimen OÖLM 1941/433). The eyes were very dark orange. Its length was 35.5–40 cm (14.0–15.7 in) and wing length 26.4 cm (10.4 in), with males being smaller than females. Weight was around 600 g.

=== Vocalisations ===
The call of the laughing owl has been described as "a loud cry made up of a series of dismal shrieks frequently repeated". The species was given its name because of this sound. Other descriptions of the call were: "A peculiar barking noise ... just like the barking of a young dog"; "Precisely the same as two men 'cooeying' to each other from a distance"; "A melancholy hooting note", or a high-pitched chattering, only heard when the birds were on the wing and generally on dark and drizzly nights or immediately preceding rain. Various whistling, chuckling and mewing notes were observed from a captive bird.

One correspondent claimed that laughing owls would be attracted by accordion play.

== Ecology and behaviour ==
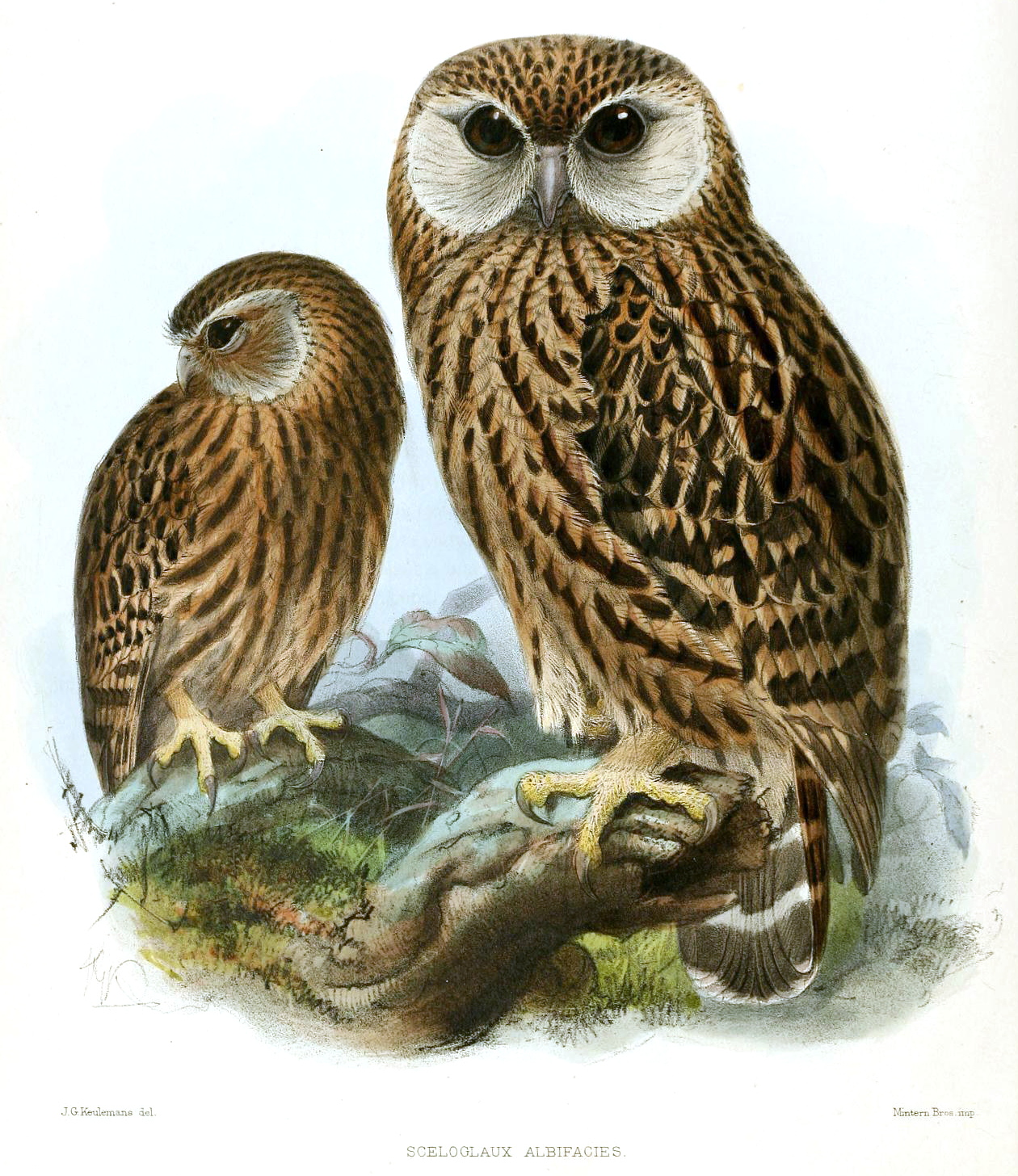
N. a. albifacies by John Gerrard Keulemans, drawn after living specimens owned by Walter Rothschild

Laughing owls generally occupied rocky, low-rainfall areas and also were found in forest districts in the North Island. Their diet was diverse, encompassing a wide range of prey items, from beetles and wētā up to birds and geckos of more than 250 g, and later on rats and mice. Laughing owls were apparently ground feeders, chasing prey on foot in preference to hunting on the wing. Knowledge of their diet, and how that diet changed over time, is preserved in fossil and subfossil deposits of their pellets. These pellets have been a great help to the palaeobiological concentrations of otherwise poorly preserved small bones: "Twenty-eight species of bird, a tuatara, three frogs, at least four geckos, a skink, two bats, and two fish contribute to the species diversity" found in a Gouland Downs roosting site's pellets.

The owls' diet generally reflected the communities of small animals in the area, taking prions (small seabirds) where they lived near colonies, Coenocorypha snipe, kākāriki and even large earthworms. Once Pacific rats were introduced to New Zealand and began to reduce the number of native prey items, the laughing owl was able to switch to eating them, instead. They were still relatively common when European settlers arrived. Being quite large, they were also able to deal with the introduced European rats that had caused the extinction of so much of their prey; however, the stoats introduced to control feral rabbits and feral cats were too much for the species.

Individuals of a bird louse of the genus Strigiphilus were found to parasitize laughing owls.

=== Reproduction ===
Breeding began in September or October. The nests were lined with dried grass and were on bare ground, in rocky ledges or fissures, or under boulders. Two white, roundish eggs were laid, measuring 44–51 by 38–43 mm (1.7–2.0 by 1.5–1.7 in). Incubation took 25 days, with the male feeding the female on the nest.

== Extinction ==
By 1880, the laughing owl had become increasingly rare, and relatively few specimens were collected, partly because of the remoteness of its range. The last confirmed specimen was found dead at Bluecliffs Station in Canterbury, New Zealand on July 5, 1914.

Unconfirmed reports continued for several decades. The last unsubstantiated records from the North Island date to 1925 and 1926, near the Wairaumoana branch of Lake Waikaremoana. Further reports came from the Pakahi area near Ōpōtiki during the 1940s. In February 1956, an unidentified bird was reportedly heard flying overhead at Saddle Hill in Fiordland, producing "a most unusual weird cry which might almost be described as maniacal". Fragments of what were apparently laughing owl eggs were also discovered in Canterbury in 1960.

The extinction of the species has been attributed to several factors, including persecution, particularly for the collection of specimens, changes in land use, and the introduction of mammalian predators such as cats and stoats. Until the late 20th century, its decline was commonly attributed to competition from introduced predators for the kiore, or Pacific rat, which was considered an important prey species of the owl. This hypothesis, originally proposed by Walter Buller, has since been questioned. Because the kiore was itself an introduced species, the laughing owl would originally have relied on native prey, including small birds, reptiles, and bats. It may also have subsequently preyed upon introduced mice. Direct predation by introduced mammals is therefore considered a more likely factor in the species' extinction, particularly given the owl's unwary and docile nature.

== Specimen gallery ==
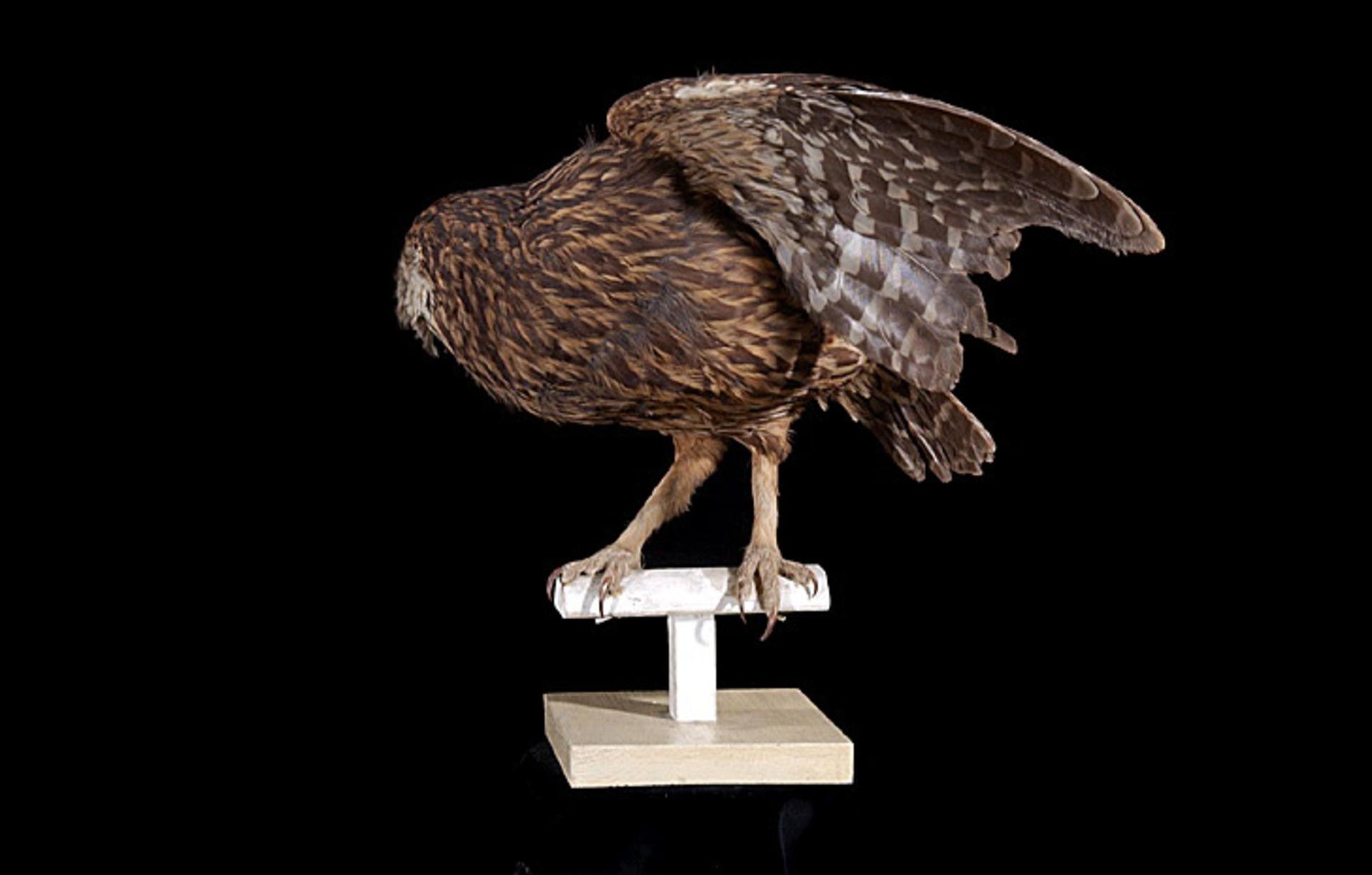

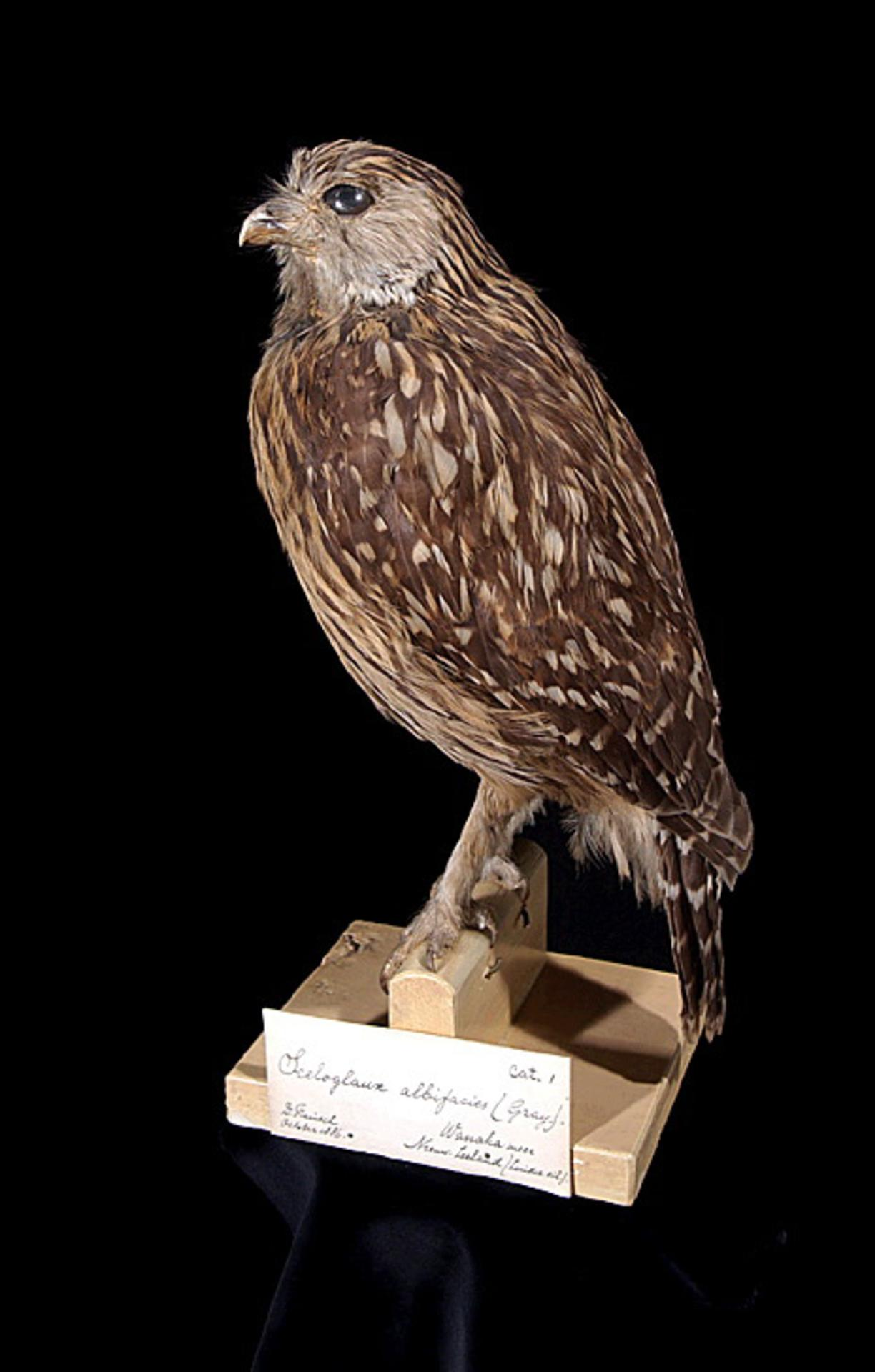

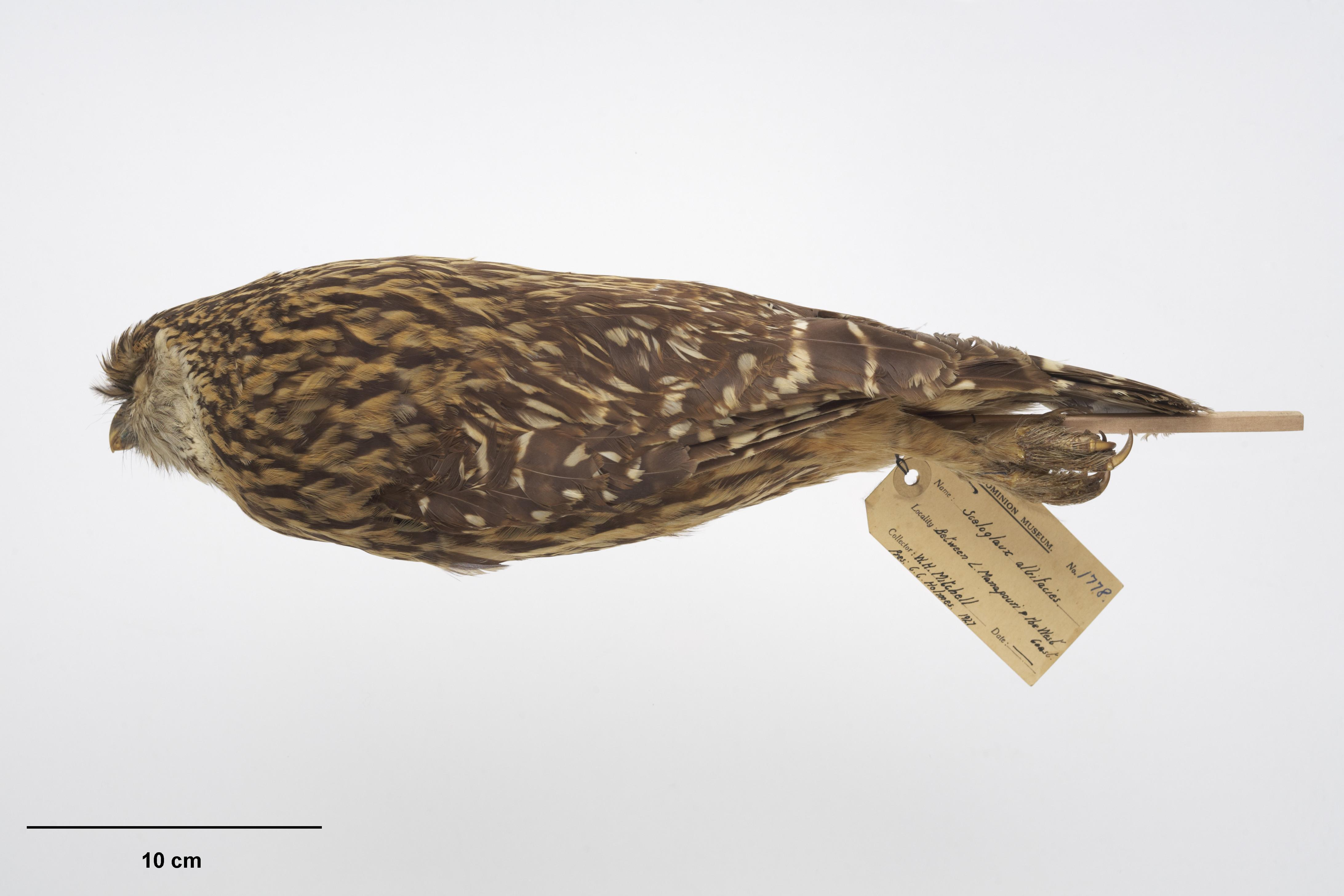

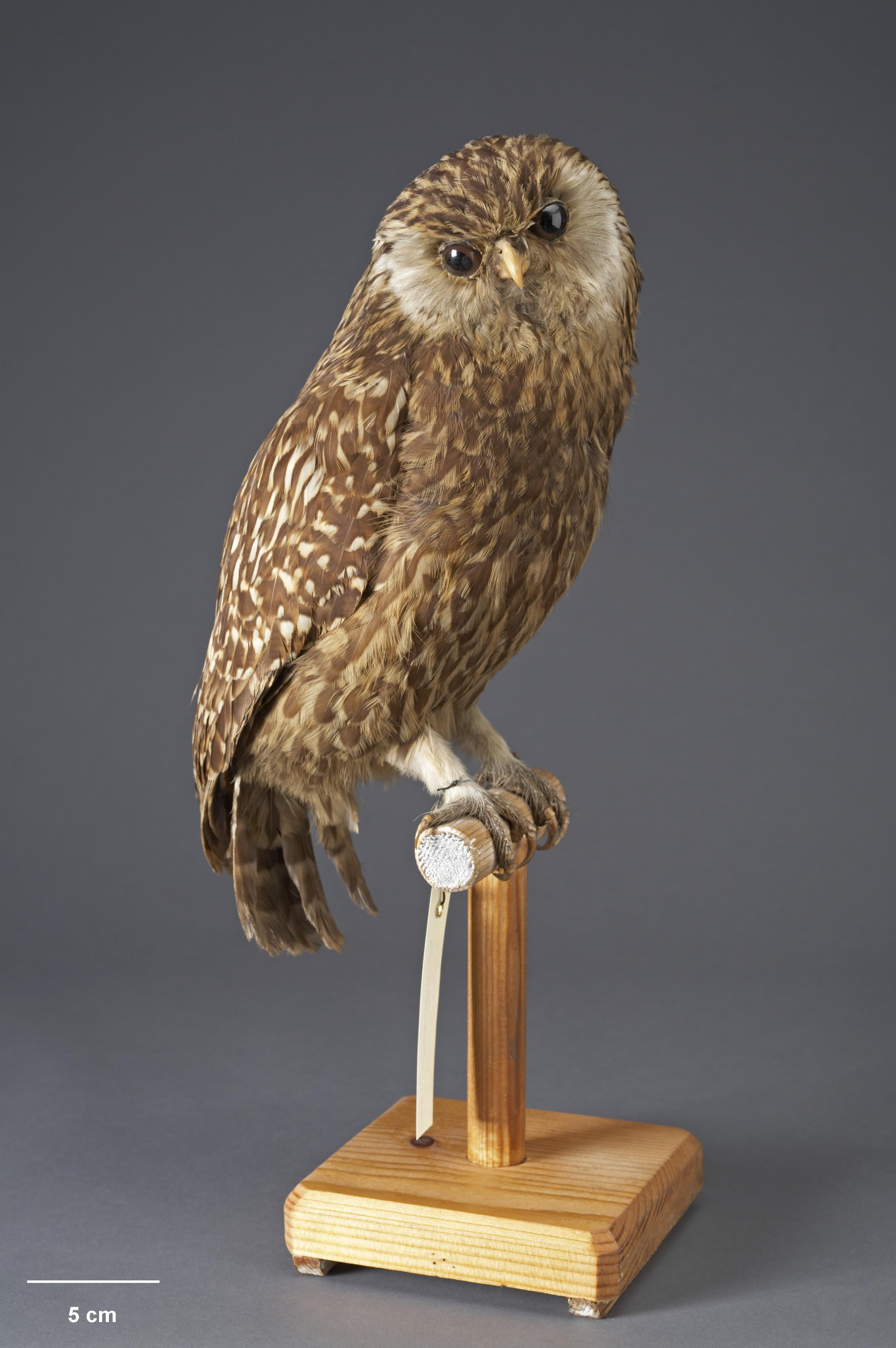

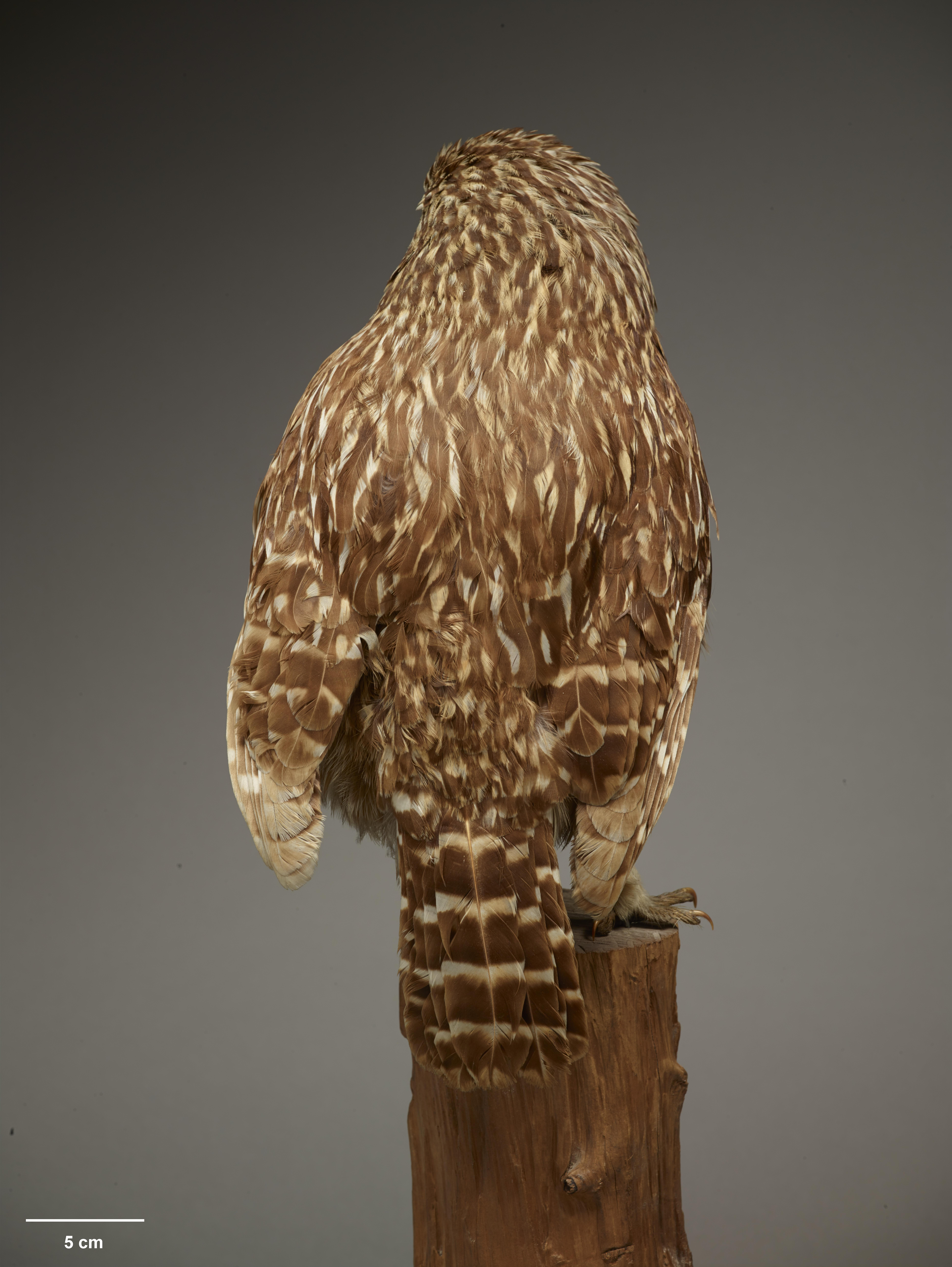

== Illustration gallery ==
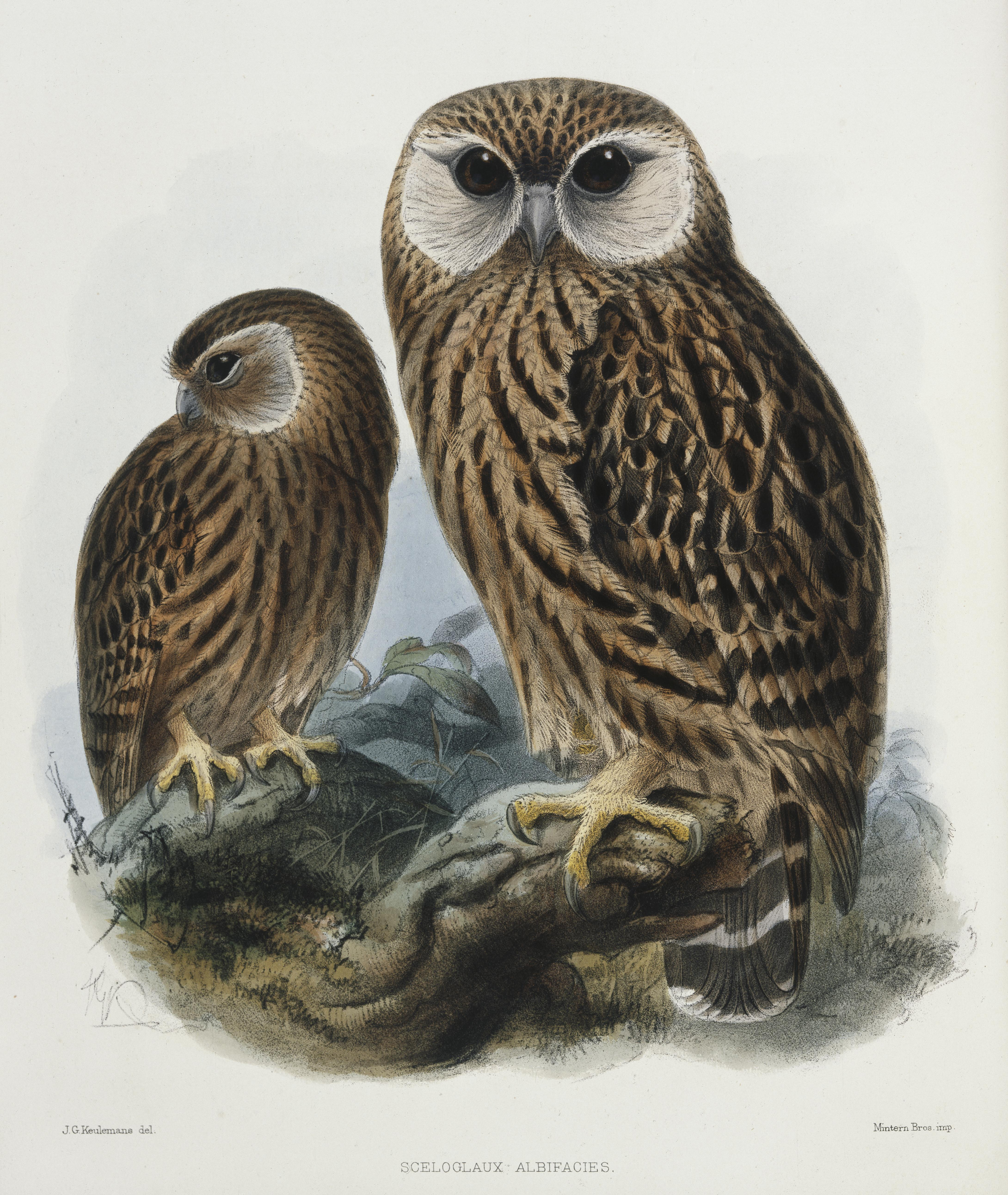

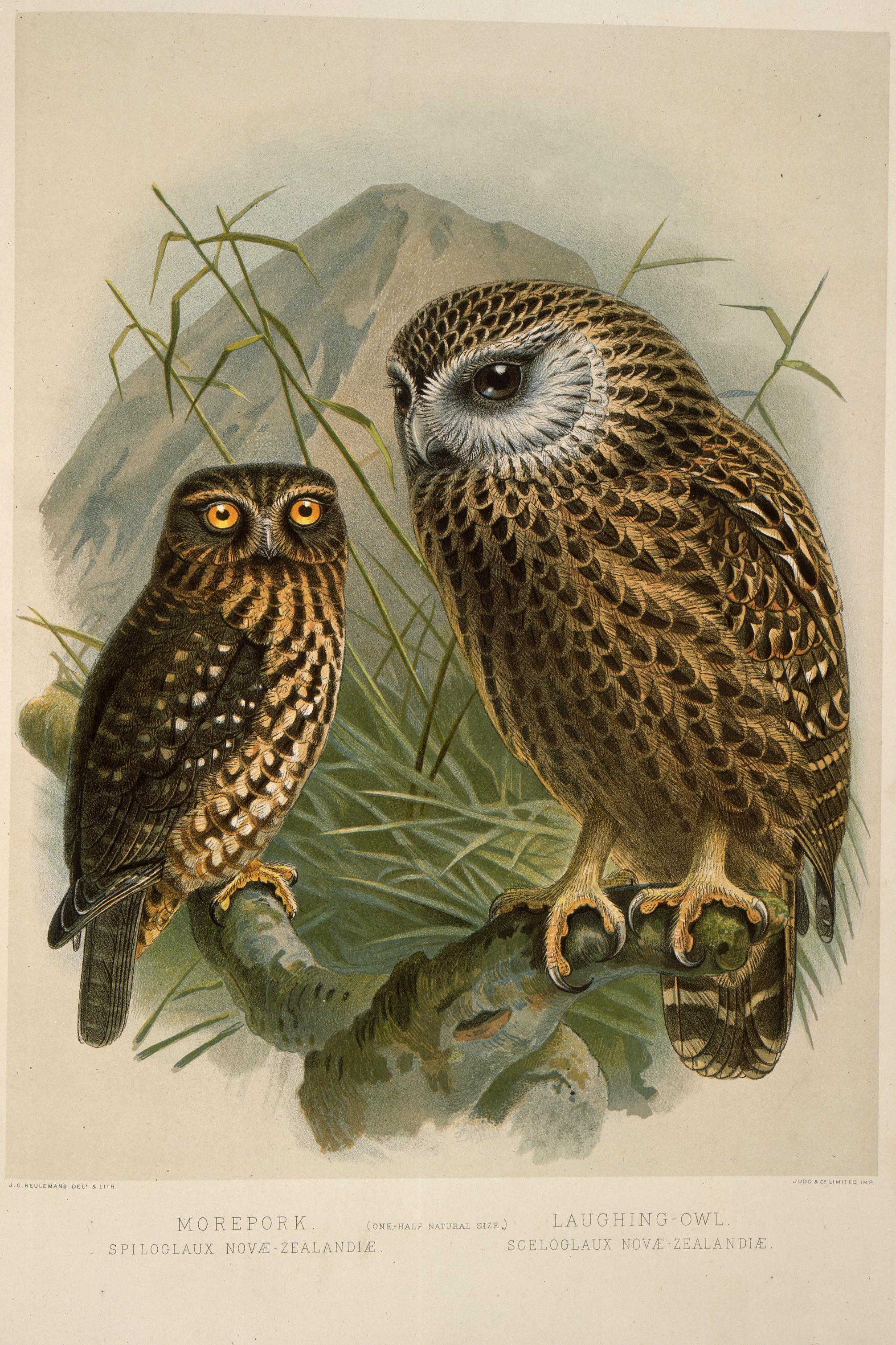

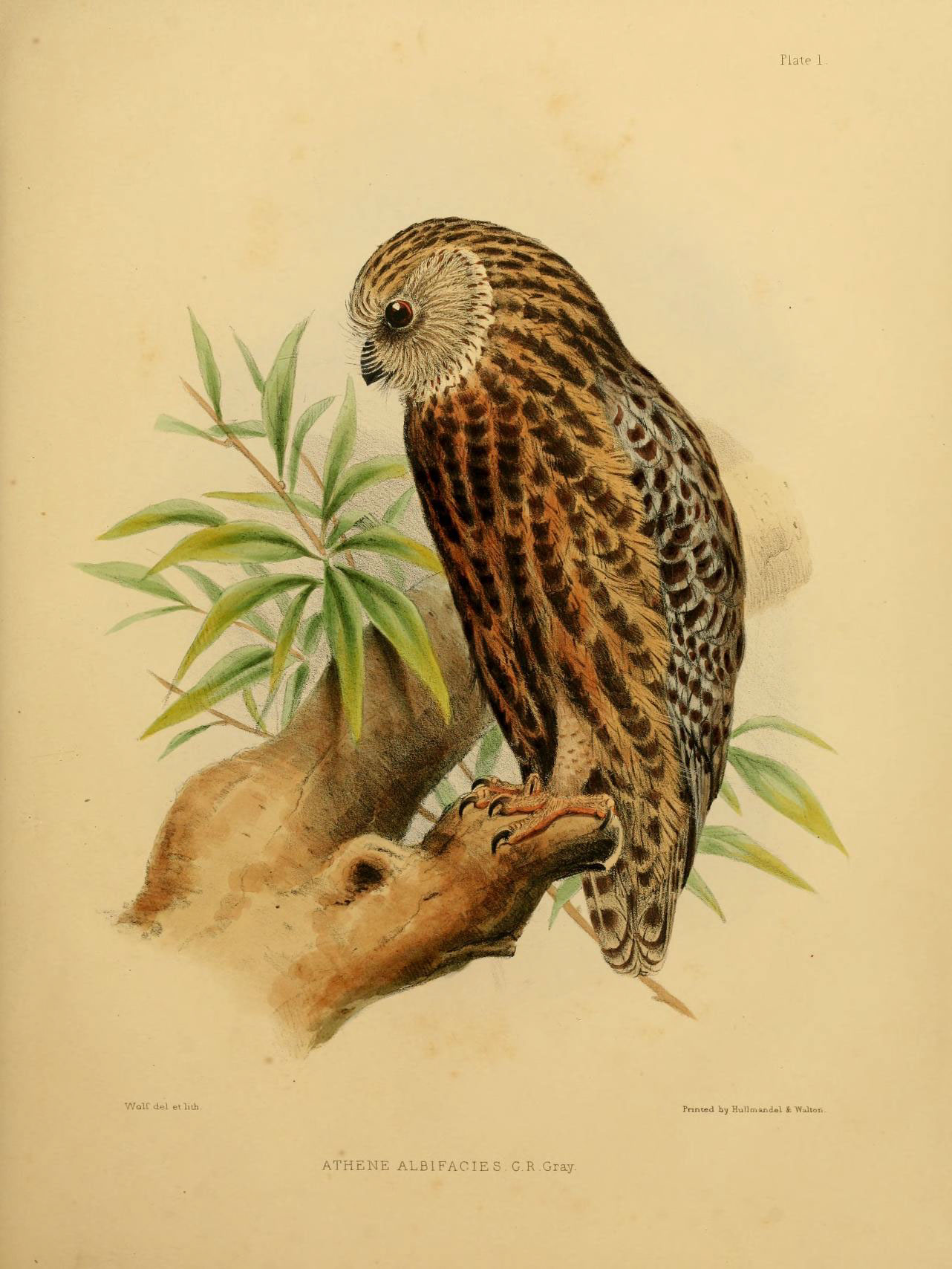

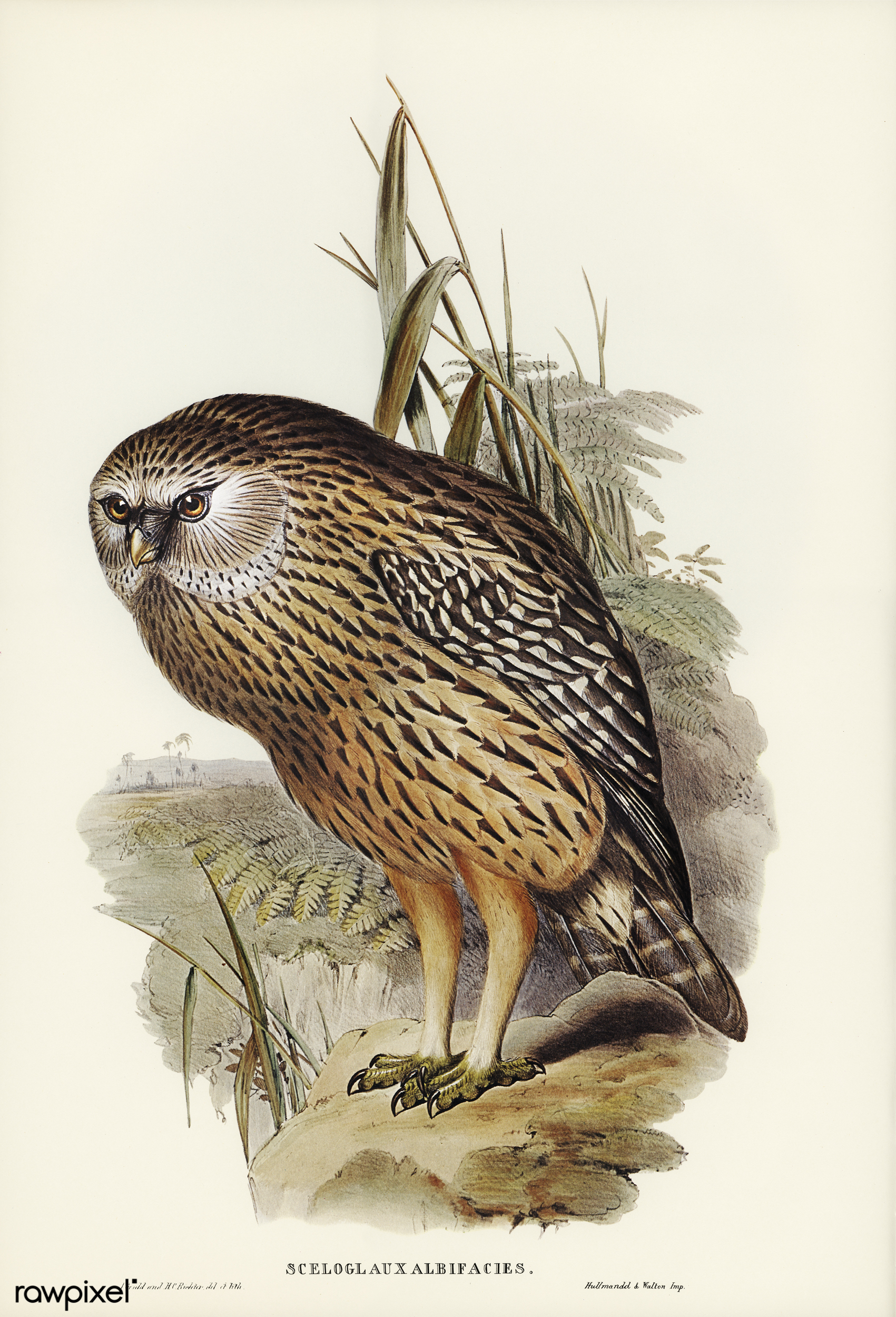

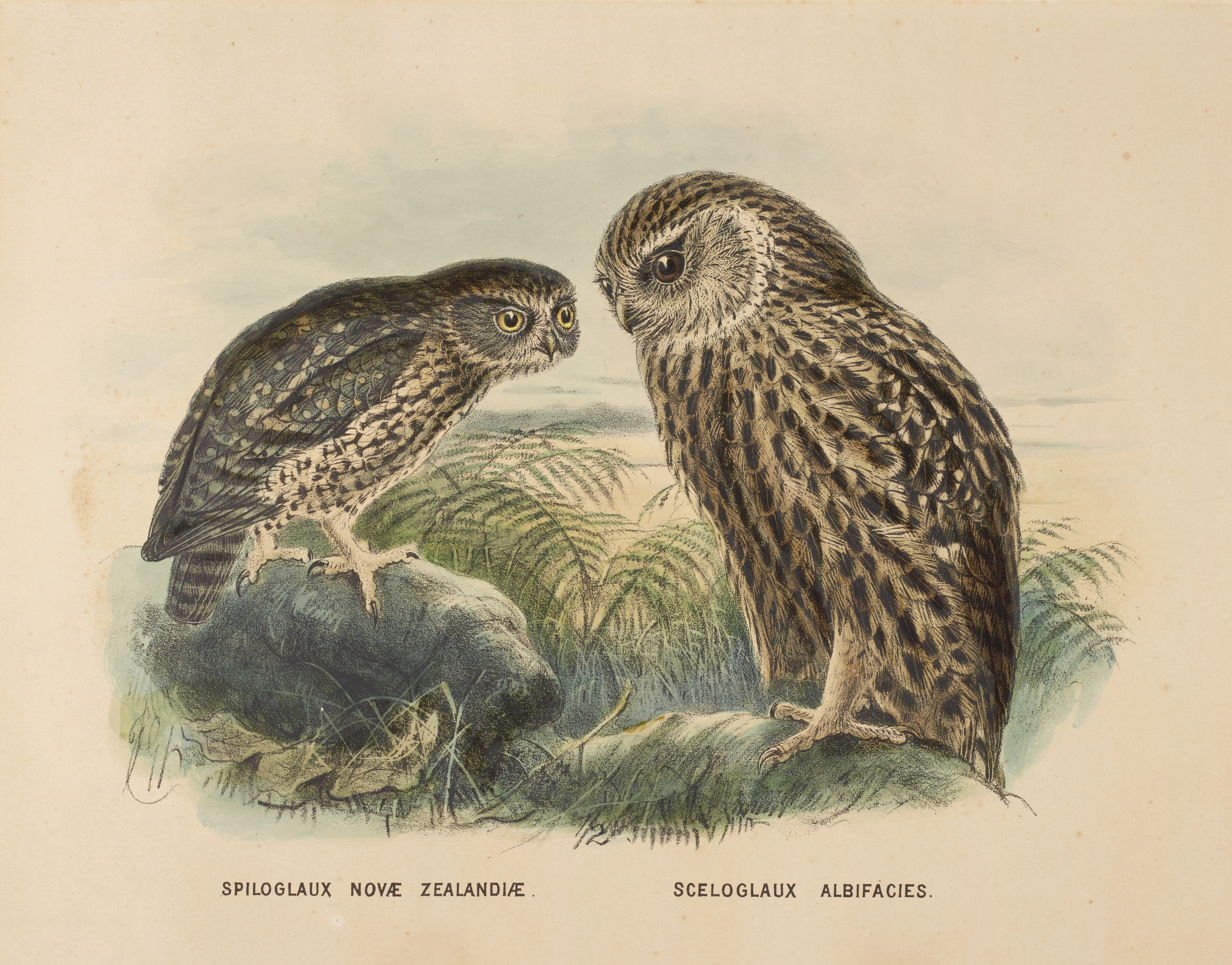
