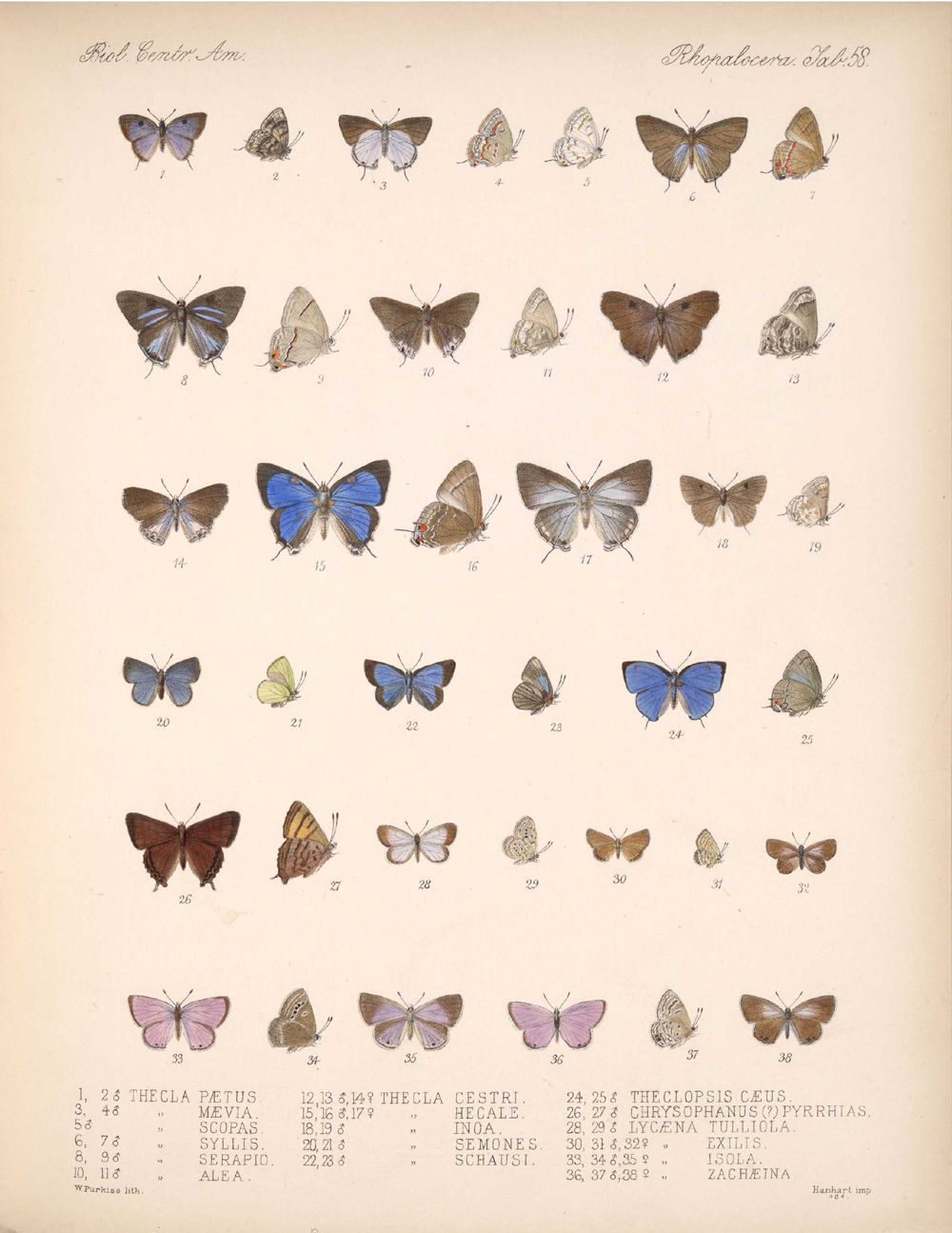
- Ziegleria syllis, figures 6 and 7

Scientific classification
- Domain: Eukaryota
- Kingdom: Animalia
- Phylum: Arthropoda
- Class: Insecta
- Order: Lepidoptera
- Family: Lycaenidae
- Tribe: Eumaeini
- Genus: Ziegleria; K. Johnson, 1993

Synonyms
- Kisutam K. Johnson & Kroenlein, 1993; Pendantus K. Johnson & Kroenlein, 1993

= Ziegleria =

Butterfly genus in family Lycaenidae

Ziegleria is a genus of butterflies in the family Lycaenidae erected by Kurt Johnson in 1993. The species of this genus are found in the Neotropical realm.

== Species ==
- Ziegleria ceromia (Hewitson, 1877)
- Ziegleria denarius (Butler & H. Druce, 1872)
- Ziegleria guzanta (Schaus, 1902)
- Ziegleria hernandezi (Johnson & Kroenlein, 1993)
- Ziegleria hesperitis (Butler & H. Druce, 1872)
- Ziegleria hoffmani Johnson, 1993
- Ziegleria micandriana (Johnson, 1992)
- Ziegleria perisus (H. H. Druce, 1907)
- Ziegleria syllis (Godman & Salvin, [1887])
