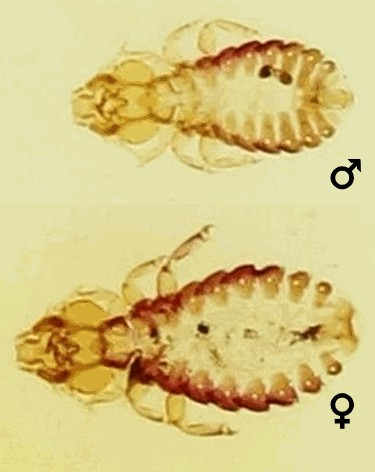
- Holotype ♂; paratype ♀.

Scientific classification
- Kingdom: Animalia
- Phylum: Arthropoda
- Clade: Pancrustacea
- Class: Insecta
- Order: Psocodea
- Infraorder: Phthiraptera
- Family: Philopteridae
- Genus: Strigiphilus
- Species: S. garylarsoni

Binomial name
- Strigiphilus garylarsoni Clayton, 1990

= Strigiphilus garylarsoni =

Species of insect

Strigiphilus garylarsoni is a species of chewing louse found only on owls. The species was first described by biologist Dale H. Clayton in 1990, who named it after cartoonist Gary Larson.

Its type host is the Northern white-faced owl (Ptilopsis leucotis). The type location is Ndola, Zambia.

== Etymology ==
It was named after Gary Larson, creator of the syndicated cartoon The Far Side. In a letter to Larson, Clayton praised the cartoonist for "the enormous contribution that my colleagues and I feel you have made to biology through your cartoons." In his 1989 book The Prehistory of the Far Side, Larson stated, "I considered this an extreme honor. Besides, I knew no one was going to write and ask to name a new species of swan after me. You have to grab these opportunities when they come along." Clayton wrote he honored Larson "in appreciation of the unique light he has shed on the workings of nature."

== See also ==
- List of organisms named after famous people (born 1950–1974)
- Serratoterga larsoni
- Thagomizer
