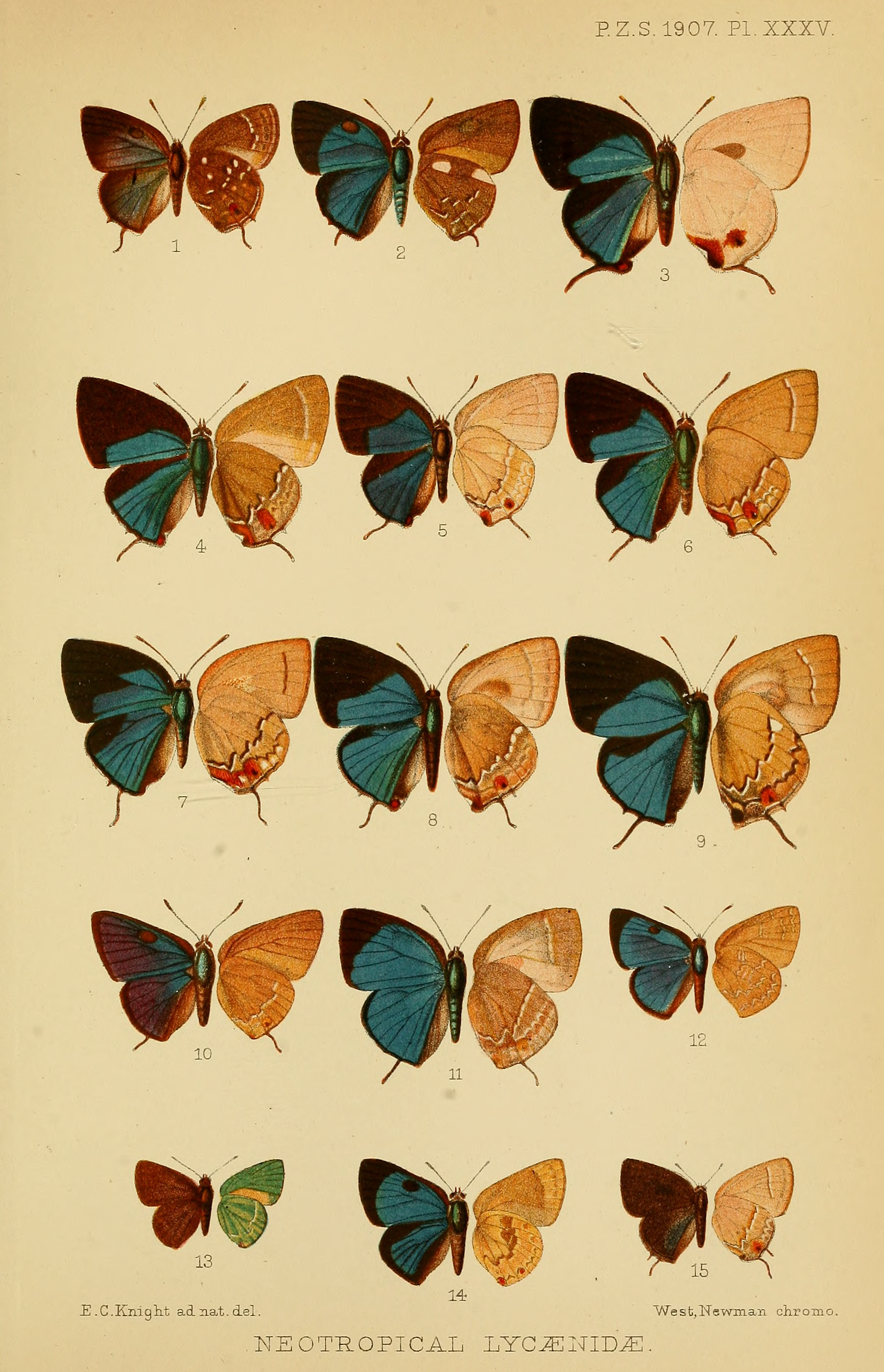
- Strephonota and related species in Hamilton Herbert Druce's 1907 On Neotropical Lycaenidae, with Descriptions of New Species

Scientific classification
- Domain: Eukaryota
- Kingdom: Animalia
- Phylum: Arthropoda
- Class: Insecta
- Order: Lepidoptera
- Family: Lycaenidae
- Tribe: Eumaeini
- Genus: Strephonota; K. Johnson, Austin, Le Crom & Salazar, 1997

Synonyms
- Dindyminotes K. Johnson, Austin, Le Crom & Salazar, 1997; Letizia K. Johnson, Austin, Le Crom & Salazar, 1997; Robustana K. Johnson, Austin, Le Crom & Salazar, 1997; Serratonotes K. Johnson, Austin, Le Crom & Salazar, 1997; Syedranota K. Johnson, Austin, Le Crom & Salazar, 1997; Treboniana K. Johnson, Austin, Le Crom & Salazar, 1997; Zigirina K. Johnson, Austin, Le Crom & Salazar, 1997

= Strephonota =

Butterfly genus in family Lycaenidae

Strephonota is a Neotropical genus of butterflies in the family Lycaenidae. The genus was erected by Kurt Johnson, George T. Austin, Jean Francois Le Crome and Julián A. Salazar E. in 1997.

== Species ==
- Strephonota acameda (Hewitson, 1867)
- Strephonota adela (Staudinger, 1888)
- Strephonota agrippa (Fabricius, 1793)
- Strephonota ambrax (Westwood, 1852)
- Strephonota azurinus (Butler & H. Druce, 1872)
- Strephonota berardi Faynel & A. Moser, 2011
- Strephonota bicolorata Faynel, 2003
- Strephonota buechei Faynel & A. Moser, 2011
- Strephonota caeruleus Faynel & A. Moser, 2011
- Strephonota carteia (Hewitson, 1870)
- Strephonota cyllarissus (Herbst, 1800)
- Strephonota elika (Hewitson, 1867)
- Strephonota ericeta (Hewitson, 1867)
- Strephonota falsistrephon Faynel & Brévignon, 2003
- Strephonota foyi (Schaus, 1902)
- Strephonota jactator (H. H. Druce, 1907)
- Strephonota malvania (Hewitson, 1867)
- Strephonota parvipuncta (Lathy, 1926)
- Strephonota perola (Hewitson, 1867)
- Strephonota porphyritis (H. H. Druce, 1907)
- Strephonota pulchritudo (H. H. Druce, 1907)
- Strephonota purpurantes (H. H. Druce, 1907)
- Strephonota sphinx (Fabricius, 1775)
- Strephonota strephon (Fabricius, 1775)
- Strephonota syedra (Hewitson, 1867)
- Strephonota tephraeus (Geyer, 1837)
- Strephonota trebonia (Hewitson, 1870)
- Strephonota tyriam (H. H. Druce, 1907)
