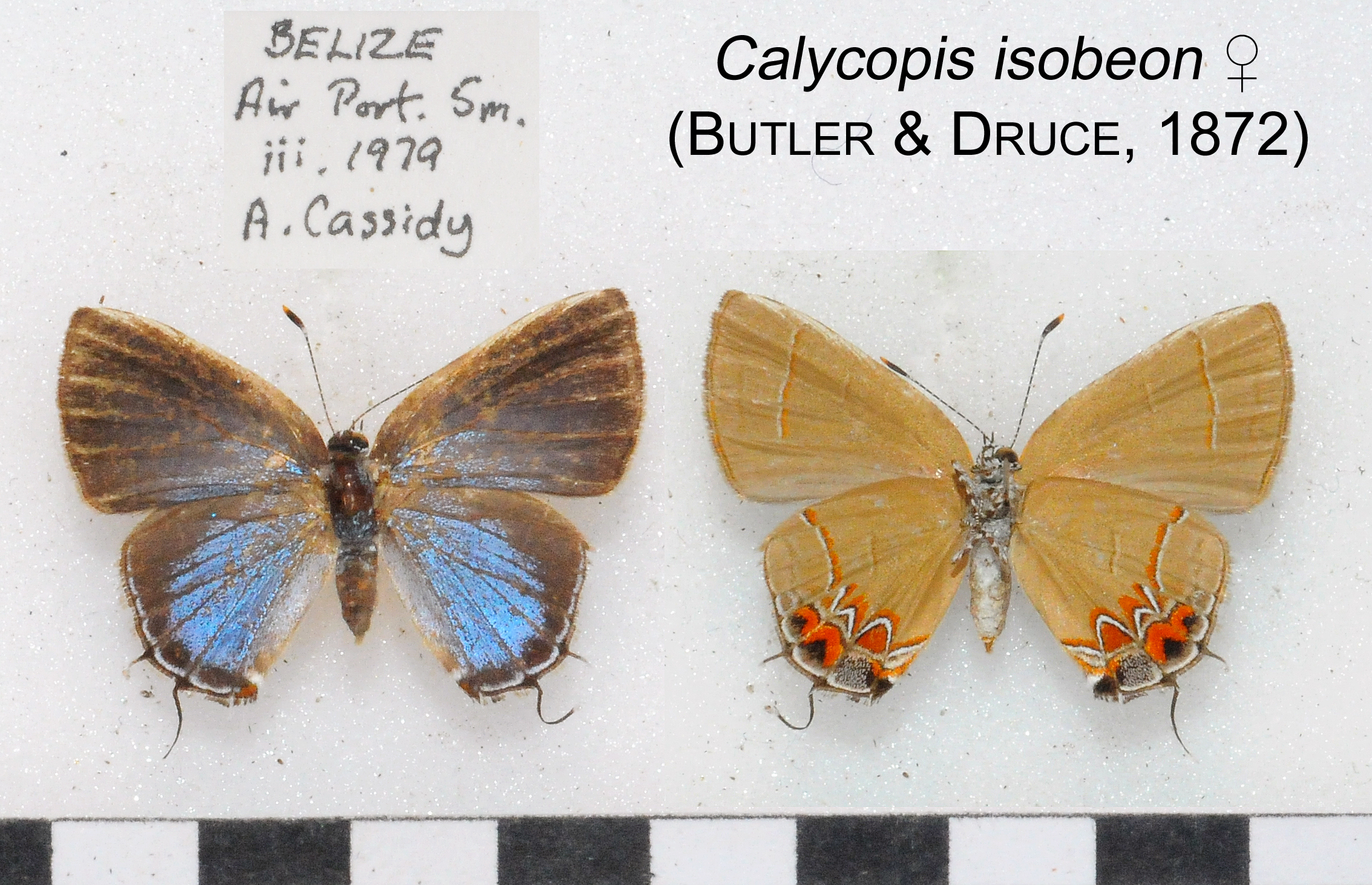

Scientific classification
- Domain: Eukaryota
- Kingdom: Animalia
- Phylum: Arthropoda
- Class: Insecta
- Order: Lepidoptera
- Family: Lycaenidae
- Genus: Calycopis
- Species: C. isobeon

Binomial name
- Calycopis isobeon Butler & H. Druce, 1872

= Calycopis isobeon =

Species of butterfly

Calycopis isobeon, the dusky-blue groundstreak, is a butterfly native to the Americas, ranging from Venezuela to central Texas. It is very similar to the red-banded hairstreak (Calycopis cecrops) and the two are sometimes treated as conspecific.
