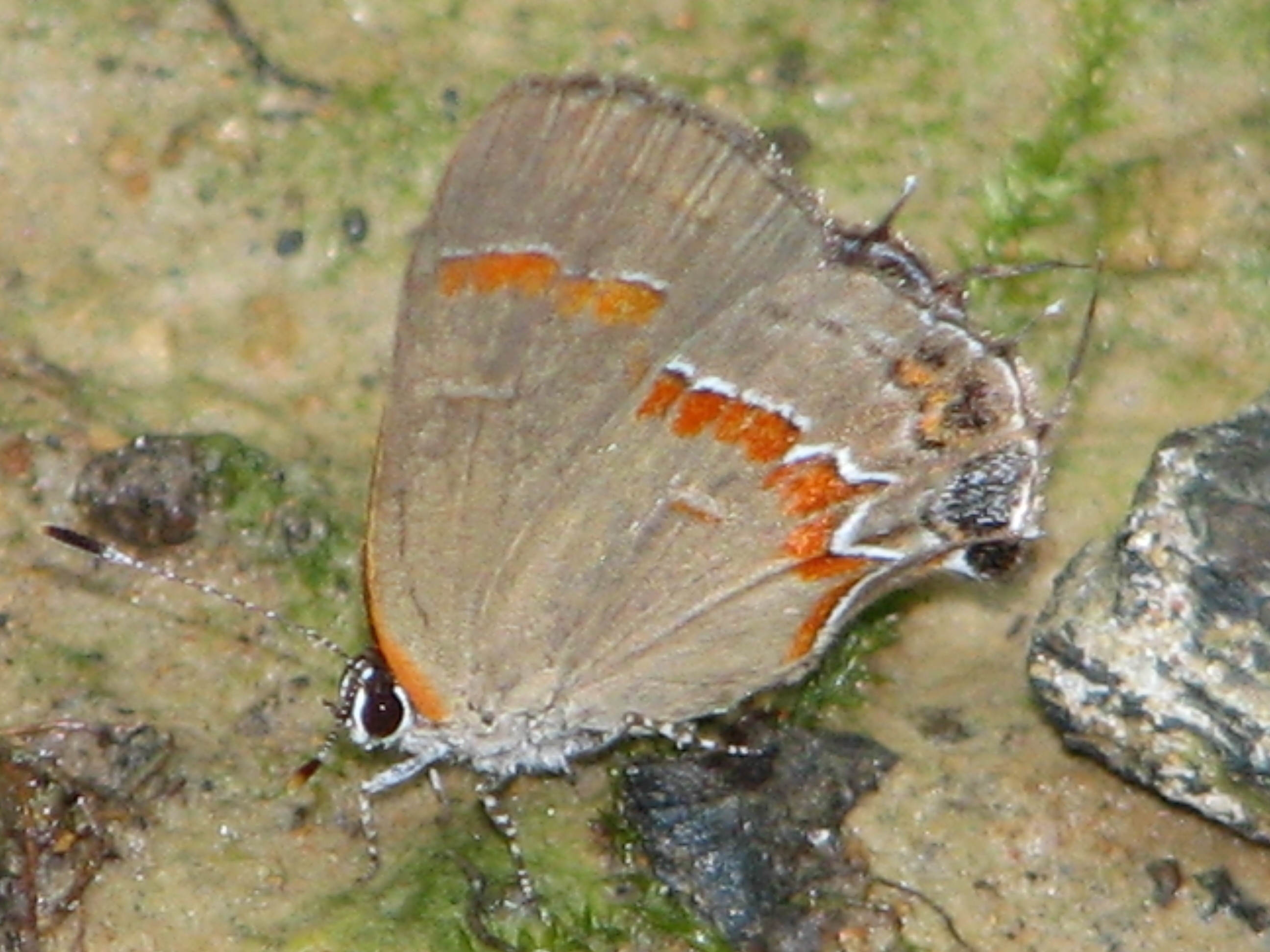
- Calycopis cecrops
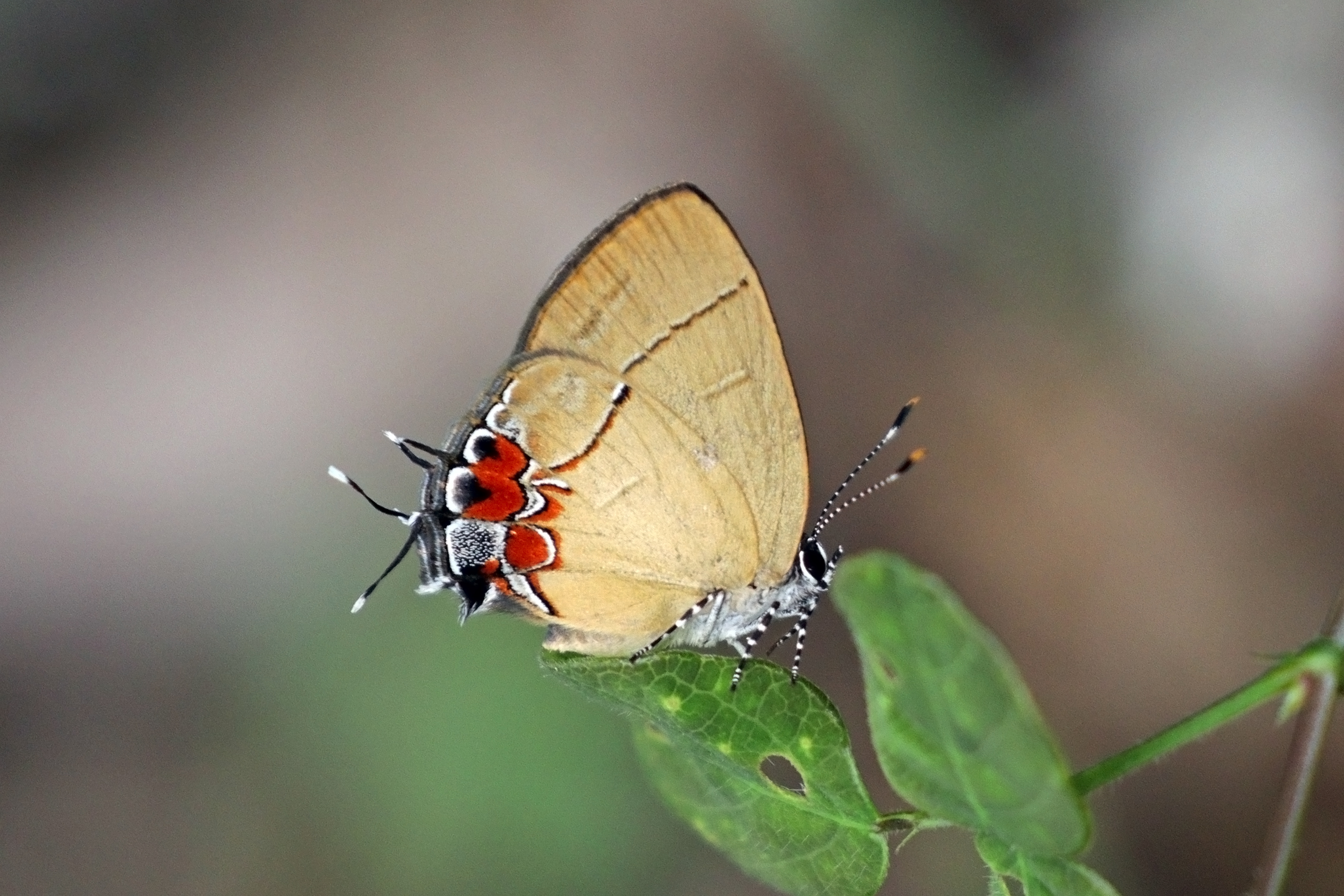
- Trebula groundstreak, Calycopis trebula, Panama

Scientific classification
- Domain: Eukaryota
- Kingdom: Animalia
- Phylum: Arthropoda
- Class: Insecta
- Order: Lepidoptera
- Family: Lycaenidae
- Tribe: Eumaeini
- Genus: Calycopis; Scudder, 1876

Species
- Many, see text

Synonyms
- Antrissima K.Johnson, 1991; Argentostriatus K.Johnson, 1991; Calistryma Field, 1967 (lapsus); Calystryma Field, 1967; Cyanodivida K.Johnson, 1991; Distissima K.Johnson, 1991; Femniterga K.Johnson, 1988; Fieldia K.Johnson, 1991 (non Nicolescu, 1979: preoccupied); Furcovalva K.Johnson, 1991; Gigantofalca K.Johnson, 1991; Klaufera K.Johnson, 1991; Kroenleina K.Johnson, 1991; Mercedes K.Johnson, 1991; Morphissima K.Johnson, 1991; Profieldia K.Johnson, 1992; Reversustus K.Johnson, 1991; Serratofalca K.Johnson, 1991; Serratoterga K.Johnson, 1991; Terminospinissima K.Johnson, 1991; Tergissima K.Johnson, 1988

= Calycopis =

Butterfly genus in family Lycaenidae

Calycopis is a genus of butterflies in the family Lycaenidae. Massively split up by Kurt Johnson in 1991, most modern authors consider the changes proposed at that time to be unjustified. Most of the species of this genus are found in the Neotropical realm and others in the Nearctic realm.

Species include:

- Calycopis cecrops Fabricius, 1793 – red-banded hairstreak
- Calycopis isobeon Butler & H. Druce, 1872
- Calycopis pisis (Godman & Salvin, 1887)
- Calycopis trebula (Hewitson, 1868); Trebula groundstreak

Several proposed species are of doubtful validity.
