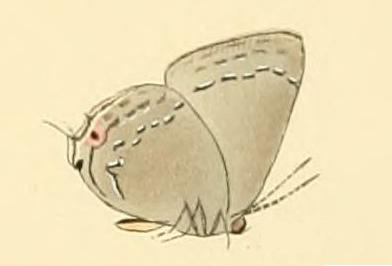

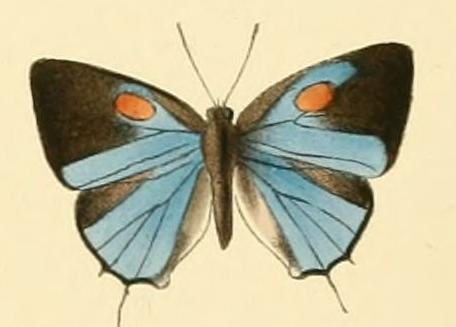

Scientific classification
- Domain: Eukaryota
- Kingdom: Animalia
- Phylum: Arthropoda
- Class: Insecta
- Order: Lepidoptera
- Family: Lycaenidae
- Genus: Strephonota
- Species: S. tephraeus

Binomial name
- Strephonota tephraeus (Geyer, 1837)

Synonyms
- Bithys tephraeus Geyer, 1837; Thecla tephraeus; Siderus tephraeus; Dindyminotes tephraeus; Thecla faventia Hewitson, 1867; Thecla villia Hewitson, 1869; Callipsyche villia; Thecla nippia Dyar, 1918

= Strephonota tephraeus =

Species of butterfly

Strephonota tephraeus is a species of butterfly of the family Lycaenidae. It is found from Mexico to Venezuela, the Amazon, the Guianas and Peru. Rare strays can be found as far north as the lower Rio Grande Valley in Texas. The habitat consists of lowland tropical forests, particularly along rivers.

The wingspan is 22–29 mm. Adults are on wing from May to December in Mexico in multiple generations per year. Adults have been recorded in November in southern Texas. Adults presumably feed on flower nectar.
