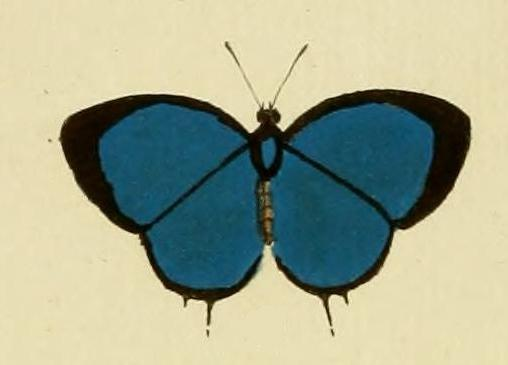

Scientific classification
- Kingdom: Animalia
- Phylum: Arthropoda
- Clade: Pancrustacea
- Class: Insecta
- Order: Lepidoptera
- Family: Lycaenidae
- Genus: Strephonota
- Species: S. sphinx

Binomial name
- Strephonota sphinx (Fabricius, 1775)

Synonyms
- Papilio sphinx Fabricius, 1775; Papilio dindymus Cramer, [1775]; Thecla stilbia Hewitson, 1867; Thecla proba Godman & Salvin, [1887]; Thecla climicles Dyar, 1914; Thecla purissima Draudt, 1920

= Strephonota sphinx =

Species of butterfly

Strephonota sphinx is a species of butterfly of the family Lycaenidae. It is found in Panama, Colombia, the Amazon, Bolivia, Peru and the Guianas.
