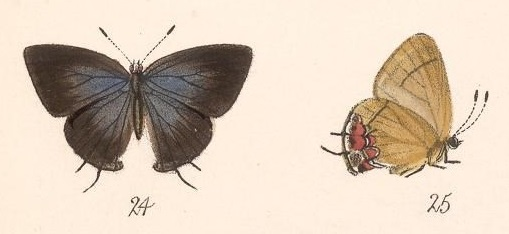
- female
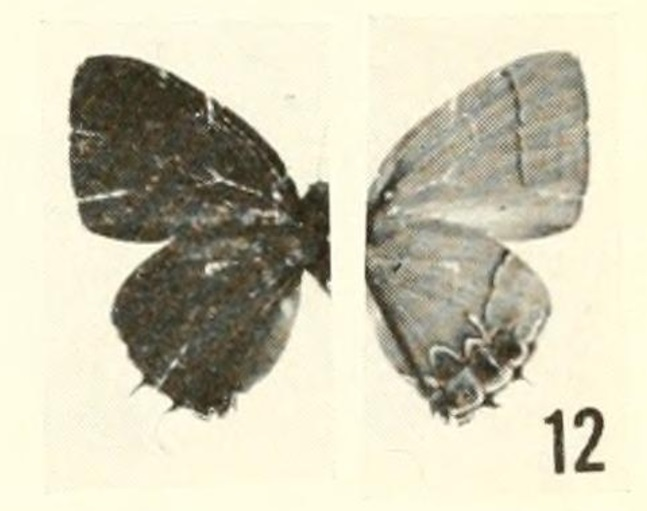
- Male, upper surface on left; under surface on right

Scientific classification
- Kingdom: Animalia
- Phylum: Arthropoda
- Class: Insecta
- Order: Lepidoptera
- Family: Lycaenidae
- Genus: Calycopis
- Species: C. pisis

Binomial name
- Calycopis pisis (Godman & Salvin, 1887)

Synonyms
- Thecla pisis Godman & Salvin, 1887; Calystryma pisis (Godman & Salvin, 1887) Field, 1967; Klaufera pisis (Godman & Salvin, 1887) Johnson, 1991; Serratoterga larsoni Johnson, 1991

= Calycopis pisis =

Pisis groundstreak

Species of butterfly

Calycopis pisis, the pisis groundstreak, is a butterfly found in several countries in Latin America.

== Taxonomic history and synonyms ==
This species was described in 1887 by Frederick DuCane Godman and Osbert Salvin in Biologia Centrali-Americana. They placed it in the genus Thecla. In 1969, William D. Field transferred the species to his newly-circumscribed genus Calystryma. (Note: Now regarded as a junior synonym of the genus Calycopis Scudder, 1876.) Then, in 1991, Kurt Johnson transferred it to his newly-circumscribed genus Klaufera to be its type species. In the same paper, Johnson described a species he named Serratoterga larsoni to honor the American cartoonist Gary Larson; this was the type species of Serratoterga. In 2004, R. K. Robins synonymized the two species and transferred it to the genus Calycopis, making C. larsoni an invalid junior synonym.

== Distribution ==
It has been found in several parts of Latin America, including Guatemala, Nicaragua, Panama, Honduras, Ecuador, Belize, Mexico (in the states of Veracruz and Oaxaca) and in northern Brazil. H. L. Lewis listed a specimen of C. pisis as being from the island of Trinidad, but other lepidopterists have said they believe this to be an error.

A type locality was not initially specified, but the specimen designated as the lectotype was collected in Bugaba, Chiriquí Province, Panama. The type locality for the junior synonym C. larsoni is Santo Domingo, Ecuador.

== Description ==
The forewings measure 13–14.5 mm (0.51–0.57 in) for the males and 13.5 mm (0.53 in) for the female. The wings' underside for both sexes are the same: they are a pale brownish gray with a slight yellow iridescence and with a pattern of red, eye-like markings on the hindwing around the M_{3} and Cu_{1} cells (see the Comstock–Needham system of insect wing nomenclature). The upper surface of the male wings are a purple metallic color. The upper surface of the female forewing is dark brown with some blue tint near the basal area. The upper surface of the female hindwings are also dark brown with iridescent blue, with dark brown spots in the M_{3} and Cu_{1} cells.
