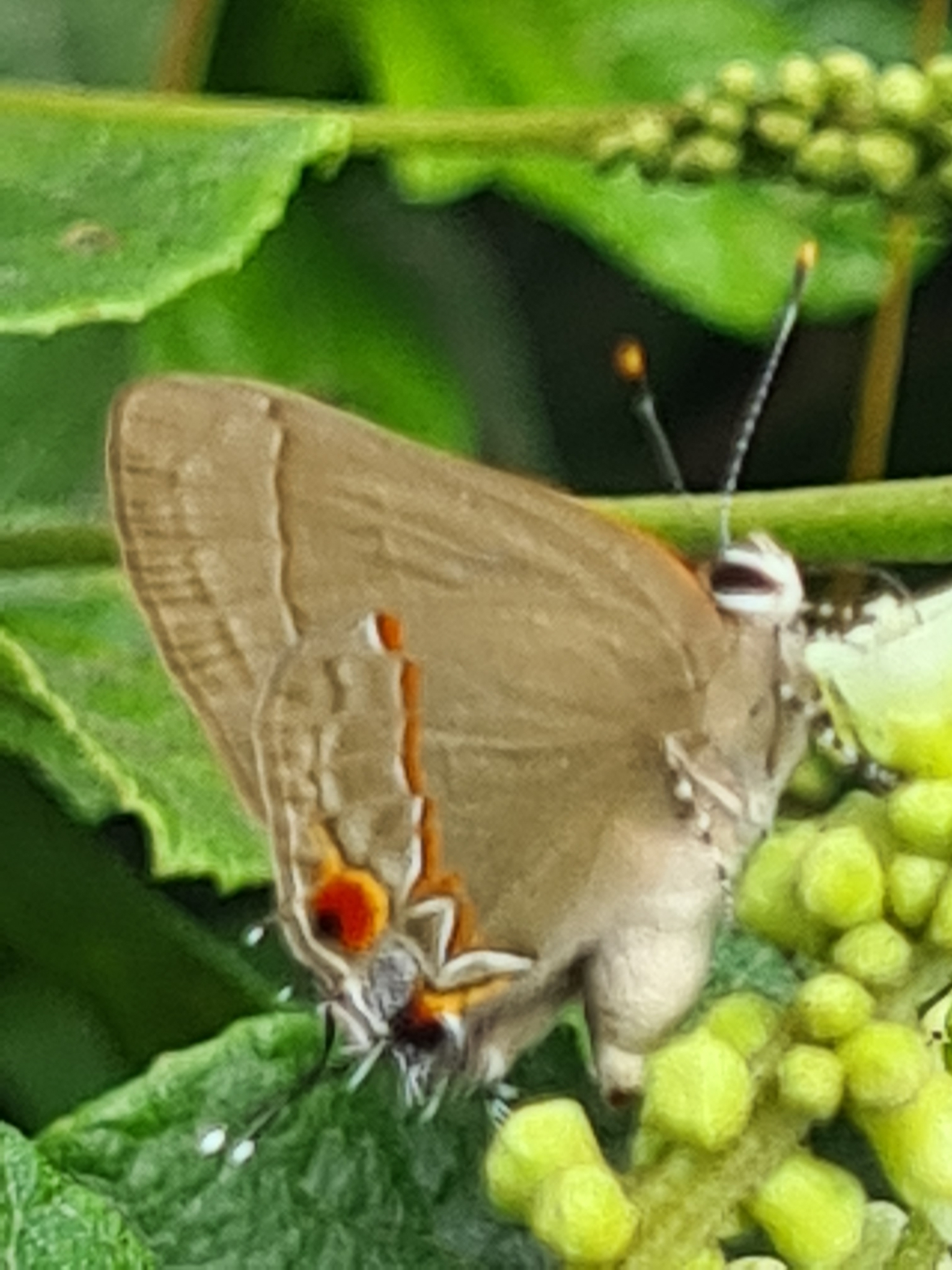

Scientific classification
- Kingdom: Animalia
- Phylum: Arthropoda
- Class: Insecta
- Order: Lepidoptera
- Family: Lycaenidae
- Genus: Kisutam
- Species: K. syllis

Binomial name
- Kisutam syllis (Godman & Salvin, 1887)

Synonyms
- Thecla syllis Godman & Salvin, 1887; Thecla politus Druce, 1907; Thecla isobeon var. subisobeon Strand, 1918; Gigantorubra simplica Johnson, 1993; Ziegleria syllis

= Kisutam syllis =

Species of butterfly

Kisutam syllis, also known by its common name sky-blue groundstreak is a species from the genus Kisutam. The species was originally described by Frederick DuCane Godman and Osbert Salvin in 1887.

== Description ==
Kisutam syllis is one of the most common eumaeine species. The species can often be found around decaying fruit on wet forest floors, where they are detrivores

== Distribution ==
Like the others species in the genus Kisutam, K. sullis has been observed from Mexico to southern Brazil. This range is confirmed by observations from citizen scientists.
