= Dale Clayton =

Dale Hartwell Clayton (born October 23, 1957), a parasitologist and professor of evolution at the University of Utah. Clayton is the taxonomist of Strigiphilus garylarsoni.

== Information ==
Dale Clayton named the new species of feather louse after his favorite cartoonist, Gary Larson. Clayton has been interested in the relationships between parasites and their hosts since he was in high school. He was so intrigued with these relationships that he was able to use the research that he gathered in a high school science fair project in his Ph.D. thesis. The information was on the impact of parasites on avian conditions. He is specifically interested in the factors that allow parasite specificity, specification, co-specification, competition, and adaptive radiation. Thus far, his favorite research has been on birds and their feather-feeding lice.

== Career ==
Dale Clayton teaches the following classes:

- Ecology and Evolution
- Ornithology
- Advanced Field Ornithology
- Grad Core Seminar: Ecology and Evolution

== Education ==
Dale Clayton has received his education from the following institutions:

- NSF-NATO Postdoc, Oxford University (England), 1990–91
- Ph.D. in Evolutionary Biology, University of Chicago, 1989
- M.S. in Entomology, University of Minnesota, 1983
- B.A. in Biology (Psychology minor), Hartwick College, NY, 1979

=== Additional Education ===
- Tropical Ecology (O.T.S.), Universidad de Costa Rica, 1984
- General and Med-Vet Acarology, Ohio State University, 1985

== Honors ==
Dale Clayton has received the following honors:

- Nominee: University of Utah Distinguished Innovation & Impact Award, 2011
- Griswold Lecture, Cornell University, 2010
- Nominee: University of Utah Distinguished Teaching Award, 2009
- Henry Baldwin Ward Medalist, American Society of Parasitologists, 2008
- E. Paul Catts Memorial Lecture, Washington State Univ., 2008
- Fellow, American Ornithologists’ Union, 2007
- Secretary, Society for the Study of Evolution, 2006–2008
- Strickland Memorial Lecture, Univ. Alberta, 2004
- NSF-CAREER Award, 1997
- Elective Member, American Ornithologists' Union, 1996
- NSF-NATO Postdoctoral Fellowship – Oxford University, 1990
- American Ornithologists’ Union Council Award, 1988
