= Ziegleria hernandezi =

Scientific classification
- Domain: Eukaryota
- Kingdom: Animalia
- Phylum: Arthropoda
- Class: Insecta
- Order: Lepidoptera
- Family: Lycaenidae
- Genus: Ziegleria
- Species: Z. hernandezi

Binomial name
- Ziegleria hernandezi (Johnson & Kroenlein, 1993)

Synonyms
- Angulopis hernandezi Johnson & Kroenlein, 1993; Electrostrymon grumus K. Johnson & Kroenlein, 1993; Ministrymon grumus

Species of butterfly

Ziegleria hernandezi is a butterfly in the family Lycaenidae. It is found in Trinidad and on Cuba.
