= Strigiphilus =

Scientific classification
- Kingdom: Animalia
- Phylum: Arthropoda
- Class: Insecta
- Order: Psocodea
- Infraorder: Phthiraptera
- Family: Philopteridae
- Genus: Strigiphilus; Mjöberg, 1910

Type species
- Docophorus heterocerus Grube, 1851

Synonyms
- Eichlerius Złotorzycka, 1974; Eustrigiphilus Ewing, 1926; Neodocophorus Kéler, 1939; Tytoniella Eichler, 1949

Genus of lice

Strigiphilus is a genus of chewing lice in the suborder Ischnocera. It was circumscribed in 1910 by Eric Mjöberg.

== Taxonomic history ==
Mjöberg initially circumscribed Strigiphilus as a subgenus of the genus he referred to as Docophorus (now known as Philopterus).

In a 1966 paper, Theresa Clay recognized 29 species and grouped them into these nine species groups:

- S. crenulatus group (Giebel, 1874)
- S. cursitans group (Nitzsch, 1861) - largest number of species
- S. cursor group (Burmeister, 1838)
- S. heterocerus group (Grube, 1851)
- S. ketupae group Emerson & Elbel, 1957
- S. macrogenitalis group Emerson & Elbel, 1957
- S. rostratus group (Burmeister, 1838)
- S. siamensis group Emerson & Elbel, 1957
- S. strigis group (Pontoppidan, 1763)

== Hosts ==
Strigiphilus is the only genus of the Ischnocera to exclusively parasitize owls.

== Species ==
As of 2017, about 50 species of Strigiphilus are known, including Strigiphilus garylarsoni Clayton, 1990. (cursitans group)
