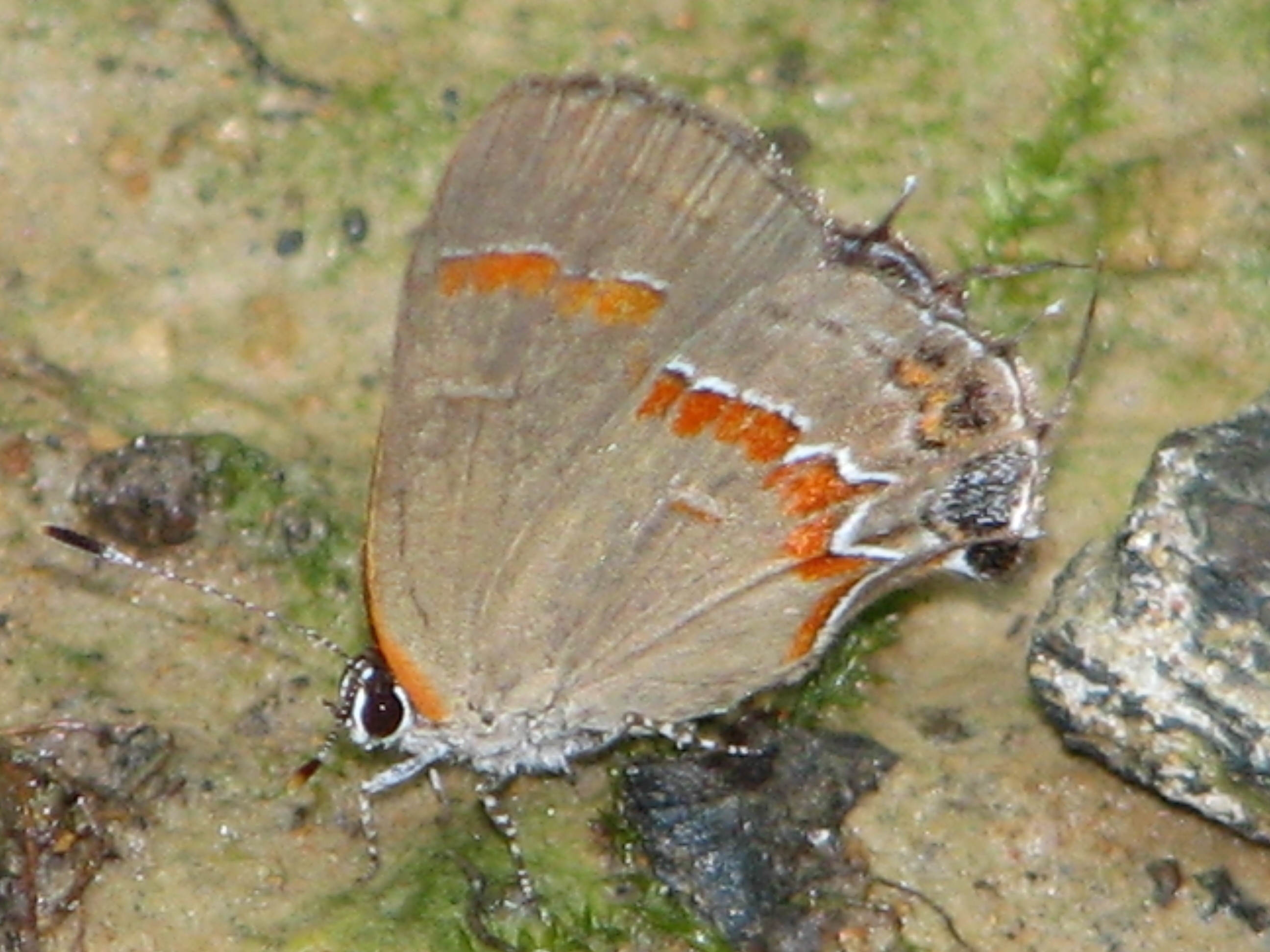

Conservation status
- Secure (NatureServe)

Scientific classification
- Kingdom: Animalia
- Phylum: Arthropoda
- Clade: Pancrustacea
- Class: Insecta
- Order: Lepidoptera
- Family: Lycaenidae
- Genus: Calycopis
- Species: C. cecrops

Binomial name
- Calycopis cecrops Fabricius, 1793

= Red-banded hairstreak =

Species of butterfly

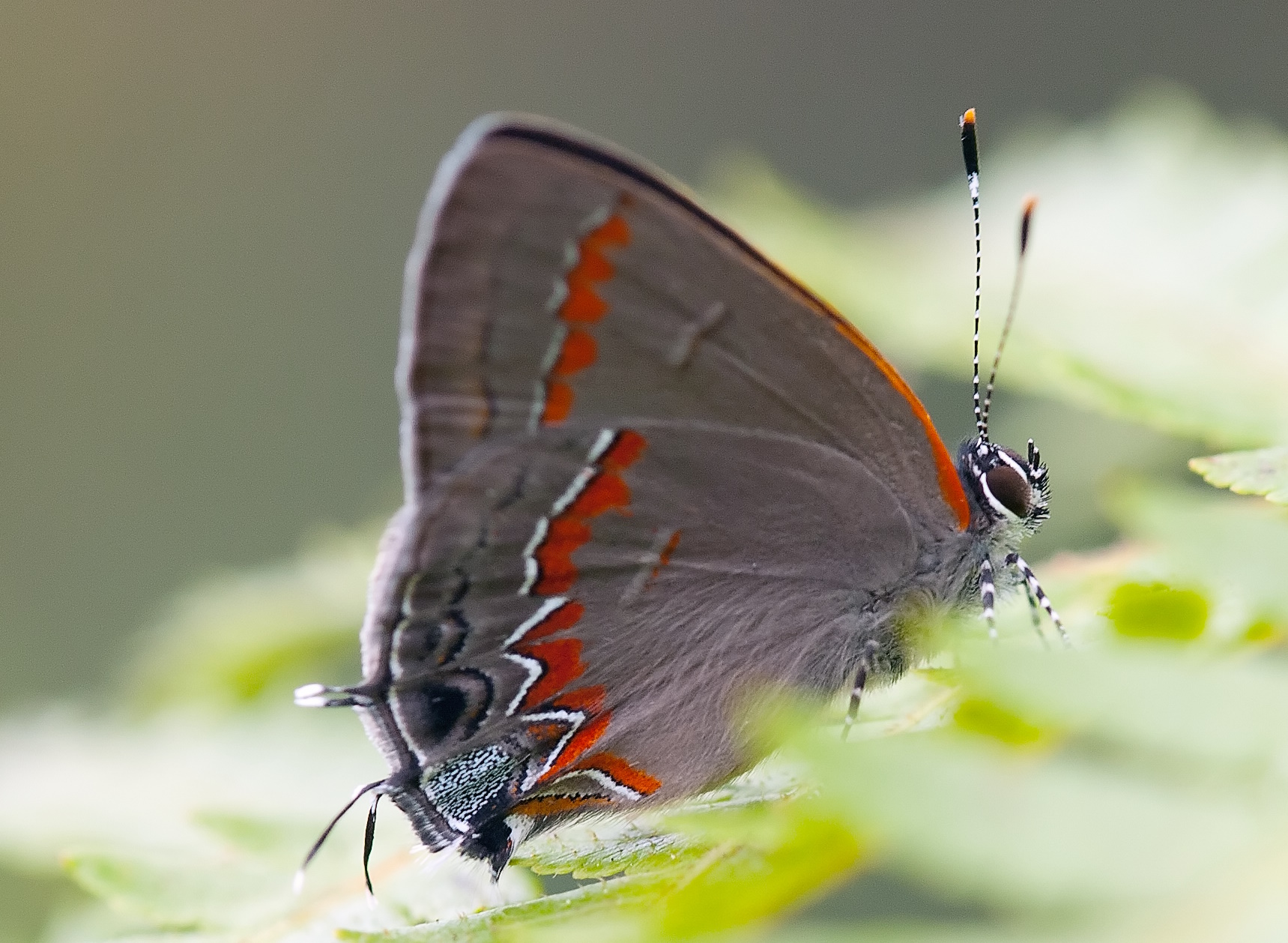
Red-banded hairstreak

The red-banded hairstreak (Calycopis cecrops) is a butterfly native to the southeastern United States. It feeds on fallen leaves of sumac species and other trees. It is 0.9–1.25 inches (23–32 mm) in size. It lives near coastal areas.

Its genome was sequenced in 2016. It has a false "head" that helps it avoid predators. In a 2012 experiment, C. cecrops was exposed to a jumping spider, Phidippus pulcherrimus, which researchers found to be a "very efficient strategy in deflecting attacks."
