= Kurt Johnson (entomologist) =

American entomologist (born 1946)

Kurt Johnson (born 1946) is an American entomologist who is also a recognized figure in comparative religion and consciousness studies. His scientific career began while he was a Christian monk, during which time he completed his doctoral studies in evolution and ecology. He is known in science for his writing on taxonomy, evolution and ecology (especially about butterflies) and in particular for his published research and popular writing on the scientific career of famous Russian–American novelist and lepidopterist Vladimir Nabokov. His book Nabokov's Blues (co-authored with journalist S. Coates) was named a "top 10 book in science" in 2000 at the Washington Post, Library Journal, Booklist and HMS Beagle.

However, Johnson also became a significant figure, and writer and lecturer in comparative religion, spirituality, consciousness and integral studies, having continued as a Christian monastic for a number of years during his active scientific career and thereafter continuing as a seminary professor, writer and guest lecturer. These aspects of Johnson's life and work are reviewed separately below.

== Science ==
Johnson spent much of his career at the University of Wisconsin–Stevens Point, and was also affiliated with the American Museum of Natural History from 1976 until 1998 and subsequently with the Florida State Collection of Arthropods (McGuire Center, University of Florida, Gainesville). During this time he published some two hundred scientific articles (and several books) on aspects of butterfly taxonomy, evolution and ecology (especially regarding tropical rainforest and high mountain habitats). Many of these publications appeared in Reports of the Museum of Natural History University of Wisconsin-Stevens Point, a series that Johnson edited personally, without peer review.

Johnson's publications, and hundreds of species and generic names created by him and a number of co-authors during that period, involved mostly "hairstreak" and "blue" butterflies. A number of these names are no longer valid, including several that were based on specimens composed of pieces of different species that had been glued together to form chimeric composites.

Polyommatines ("blues") are the same lineage studied by Vladimir Nabokov during his scientific career (first at the American Museum of Natural History and later at Harvard University) before his fame as a novelist. Accordingly, after completing scientific studies on the butterfly groups pioneered by Nabokov, and the publication with Coates of Nabokov's Blues, Johnson was a significant figure in Nabokov centennial programs and events in 1999–2000. Johnson continues to work, with a number of colleagues, on DNA studies of lycaenid butterflies as followup to the work he accomplished from 1976–1998 with anatomists Zsolt Balint (of the Hungarian Museum of Natural History, Budapest) and Dubi Benyamini (an Israeli scientist).

In addition to taxonomic work, Johnson, Balint and Benyamini published on the evolutionary and biogeographic origins of the high mountain butterflies of South America, an ongoing biogeographic mystery originally explored by Nabokov This work, and Johnson's many popular articles on science in world periodicals (including Natural History and The New York Times Science Times) also involved him in significant conservation work, as an advisor, especially in association with The Nature Conservancy (regarding American plains-prairie habitats), The World Wildlife Fund (regarding the monarch butterfly overwintering grounds in Mexico) and several endangered species, one of which (the Karner Blue) had been described by Nabokov.

== Spirituality and religion ==
Johnson was a Christian monastic (initially with the Anglican Order of the Holy Cross in New York state) and began his association with the American Museum of Natural History in New York City during that time (from 1972), and after completion of his doctoral studies in 1980. Shortly before, but mainly after, his retirement from fully active scientific work in 2000, Johnson concentrated more on activities with a monastic colleague, Brother Wayne Teasdale, a Roman Catholic monk who had become an influential pioneer in interfaith and interspiritual dialogue after publication of his books The Mystic Heart: Discovering a Universal Spirituality in the World's Religions and A Monk in the World. Johnson and Teasdale shared a background in Christian contemplation and the Hindu spirituality known as "Advaita". Johnson was ordained in both traditions and Teasdale was a well-known writer in both, with a PhD in Christian theology from Fordham University (Teasdale's last book, on the commonalities of Christian and Hindu contemplative experience was his doctoral dissertation in Theology at New York's Fordham University ). This collaboration led to them, and others, founding InterSpiritual Dialogue in Action (ISDnA) in 2002, an international association for the discussion of contemplative and mystical experience across traditions

ISDnA was active with the Parliament of the World's Religions and other inter-religious discussions. After Teasdale's death in 2004, Johnson and other colleagues of Teasdale continued and expanded ISDnA, first to include an education program based on the work and writings of Teasdale, at the One Spirit Interfaith Seminary in New York City (where Johnson joined as a faculty member in 2005). Given his academic background, Johnson also maintained ties with the humanist community, serving on the faculty of the Humanist Institute and also with American Ethical Union's United Nations representative agency The National Service Conference, and publishing on religious issues in humanist publications. Johnson also involved himself with integral philosopher Ken Wilber and the integral community in establishing an array of programs on integral spirituality at One Spirit Interfaith Seminary in New York City and Johnson and another colleague of Teasdale, Gorakh Hayashi, published additional articles on Teadale's thought

In 2009 ISDnA created the website resource "The InterSpiritual Multiplex: A Guide and Directory to InterSpirituality Worldwide" and, partnering with the Universal Order of Interfaith and the World Council of Interfaith Congregations founded "The Universal Order of Sannyasa" which Bro. Wayne Teasdale had envisioned and described in his books of 1999–2003. Soon after its founding in January 2010, the Universal Order of Sannyasa grew rapidly and modified its name to become "Community of The Mystic Heart (CMH), a Circle of Interspiritual Mystics and Contemplatives originally envisioned as The Universal Order of Sannyasa by Bro. Wayne Teasdale". As Teasdale envisioned, this association (organized as a religious order) serves to encourage spiritual life practice, sacred activism and advancement of the interspiritual message pioneered by Teasdale and others. ISDnA and CMH work closely, among others, with The Aspen Grove associates of Fr. Thomas Keating and the Christian "Centering prayer" movement and Eckhart Tolle, Michael Brown and others' publishers Namaste Publishing and their Namaste Global Community.

Johnson was born Kurt Duane Johnson, on July 21, 1946 in Iowa Falls, Iowa. He grew up primarily in Nebraska pursuing his BA and MA degrees at universities in Wisconsin and Iowa before entering the religious life in New York in 1969 and completing his PhD in the Graduate Center of the City of New York's program with the American Museum of Natural History in 1980. He continues to live in New York City.
